The legal institution of human chattel slavery, comprising the enslavement primarily of Africans and African Americans, was prevalent in the United States of America from its founding in 1776 until 1865, predominantly in the South. Slavery was established throughout European colonization in the Americas. From 1526, during early colonial days, it was practiced in what became Britain's colonies, including the Thirteen Colonies that formed the United States. Under the law, an enslaved person was treated as property that could be bought, sold, or given away. Slavery lasted in about half of U.S. states until abolition. In the decades after the end of Reconstruction, many of slavery's economic and social functions were continued through segregation, sharecropping, and convict leasing.

By the time of the American Revolutionary War (1775–1783), the status of enslaved people had been institutionalized as a racial caste associated with African ancestry. During and immediately following the Revolution, abolitionist laws were passed in most Northern states and a movement developed to abolish slavery. The role of slavery under the United States Constitution (1789) was the most contentious issue during its drafting. Although the creators of the Constitution never used the word "slavery", the final document, through the three-fifths clause, gave slave owners disproportionate political power by augmenting the congressional representation and the Electoral College votes of slaveholding states. The Fugitive Slave Clause of the Constitution—Article IV, Section 2, Clause 3—provided that, if a slave escaped to another state, the other state had to return the slave to his or her master. This clause was implemented by the Fugitive Slave Act of 1793, passed by Congress. All Northern states had abolished slavery in some way by 1805; sometimes, abolition was a gradual process, a few hundred people were enslaved in the Northern states as late as the 1840 census. Some slaveowners, primarily in the Upper South, freed their slaves, and philanthropists and charitable groups bought and freed others. The Atlantic slave trade was outlawed by individual states beginning during the American Revolution. The import trade was banned by Congress in 1808, although smuggling was common thereafter. It has been estimated that about 30% of congressmen who were born before 1840 were, at some time in their lives, owners of slaves.

The rapid expansion of the cotton industry in the Deep South after the invention of the cotton gin greatly increased demand for slave labor, and the Southern states continued as slave societies. The United States became ever more polarized over the issue of slavery, split into slave and free states. Driven by labor demands from new cotton plantations in the Deep South, the Upper South sold more than a million slaves who were taken to the Deep South. The total slave population in the South eventually reached four million. As the United States expanded, the Southern states attempted to extend slavery into the new western territories to allow proslavery forces to maintain their power in the country. The new territories acquired by the Louisiana Purchase and the Mexican Cession were the subject of major political crises and compromises. By 1850, the newly rich, cotton-growing South was threatening to secede from the Union, and tensions continued to rise. Bloody fighting broke out over slavery in the Kansas Territory. Slavery was defended in the South as a "positive good", and the largest religious denominations split over the slavery issue into regional organizations of the North and South.

When Abraham Lincoln won the 1860 election on a platform of halting the expansion of slavery, seven slave states seceded to form the Confederacy. Shortly afterward, on April 12, 1861, the Civil War began when Confederate forces attacked the U.S. Army's Fort Sumter in Charleston, South Carolina. Four additional slave states then joined the Confederacy after Lincoln, on April 15, called forth in response "the militia of the several States of the Union, to the aggregate number of seventy-five thousand, in order to suppress" the rebellion. During the war some jurisdictions abolished slavery and, due to Union measures such as the Confiscation Acts and the Emancipation Proclamation, the war effectively ended slavery in most places.  After the Union victory, the Thirteenth Amendment to the United States Constitution was ratified on December 6, 1865, prohibiting "slavery [and] involuntary servitude, except as a punishment for crime."

Origins

First enslavements

In 1508, Juan Ponce de León established the Spanish settlement in Puerto Rico, which used the native Taínos for labor. The Taínos were largely exterminated by war, overwork and diseases brought by the Spanish. In 1513, to supplement the dwindling Taíno population, the first enslaved African people were imported to Puerto Rico. The abolition of Indian slavery in 1542 with the New Laws increased the demand for African slaves.

A century and a half later, the British conducted enslaving raids in what is now Georgia, Tennessee, North Carolina, South Carolina, Florida, and possibly Alabama. The Charles Town slave trade, which included both trading and direct raids by colonists, was the largest among the British colonies in North America. Between 1670 and 1715, between 24,000 and 51,000 captive Native Americans were exported from South Carolinamore than the number of Africans imported to the colonies of the future United States during the same period. Additional enslaved Native Americans were exported from South Carolina to Virginia, Pennsylvania, New York, Rhode Island, and Massachusetts. The historian Alan Gallay says, "the trade in Indian slaves was at the center of the English empire's development in the American South. The trade in Indian slaves was the most important factor affecting the South in the period 1670 to 1715"; intertribal wars to capture slaves destabilized English colonies, Spanish Florida, and French Louisiana.

First continental African enslaved people

The first Africans enslaved within continental North America arrived via Santo Domingo to the San Miguel de Gualdape colony (most likely located in the Winyah Bay area of present-day South Carolina), founded by Spanish explorer Lucas Vázquez de Ayllón in 1526. The ill-fated colony was almost immediately disrupted by a fight over leadership, during which the enslaved people revolted and fled the colony to seek refuge among local Native Americans. De Ayllón and many of the colonists died shortly afterward of an epidemic and the colony was abandoned. The settlers and the enslaved people who had not escaped returned to Santo Domingo.

On August 28, 1565, St. Augustine, Florida, was founded by the Spanish conquistador Don Pedro Menendez de Aviles, and he brought three enslaved Africans with him. During the 16th and 17th centuries, St. Augustine was the hub of the trade in enslaved people in Spanish Florida and the first permanent settlement in what would become the continental United States to include enslaved Africans. The first birth of an enslaved African in what is now the United States was Agustín, who was born in St. Augustine in 1606.

Indentured servants

In the early years of the Chesapeake Colonies (Virginia and Maryland), colonial officials found it difficult to attract and retain laborers under the harsh frontier conditions, and there was a high mortality rate. Many laborers came from Britain as indentured laborers, signing contracts of indenture to pay for their passage, upkeep, and training with work, usually on farms. The colonies had agricultural economies. These indentured laborers were often young people who intended to become permanent residents. In some cases, convicted criminals were transported to the colonies as indentured laborers, rather than being imprisoned. The indentured laborers were not slaves, but were required to work for 4–7 years in states such as Virginia and Maryland in exchange for the cost of their passage and maintenance.

The first Africans to reach the colonies that England was struggling to establish were a group of some 20 enslaved people who arrived at Point Comfort, Virginia, near Jamestown, in August 1619, brought by British privateers who had seized them from a captured Portuguese slave ship. Colonists do not appear to have made indenture contracts for most Africans. Although it is possible that some of them were freed after a certain period, most of them remained enslaved for life. The historian Ira Berlin noted that what he called the "charter generation" in the colonies was sometimes made up of mixed-race men (Atlantic Creoles) who were indentured servants and whose ancestry was African and Iberian. They were descendants of African women and Portuguese or Spanish men who worked in African ports as traders or facilitators in the trade of enslaved people. The transformation of the status of Africans, from indentured servitude to slaves in a racial caste that they could not leave or escape, happened over the next generation.

First slave laws
There were no laws regarding slavery early in Virginia's history, but, in 1640, a Virginia court sentenced John Punch, an African, to life in servitude after he attempted to flee his service. The two whites with whom he fled were sentenced only to an additional year of their indenture, and three years' service to the colony. This marked the first de facto legal sanctioning of slavery in the English colonies and was one of the first legal distinctions made between Europeans and Africans.

In 1641, the Massachusetts Bay Colony became the first colony to authorize slavery through enacted law. Massachusetts passed the Body of Liberties, which prohibited slavery in many instances but allowed people to be enslaved if they were captives of war, if they sold themselves into slavery or were purchased elsewhere, or if they were sentenced to slavery as punishment by the governing authority. The Body of Liberties used the word "strangers" to refer to people bought and sold as slaves; they were generally not English subjects. Colonists came to equate this term with Native Americans and Africans.

In 1654, John Casor, a black indentured servant in colonial Virginia, was the first man to be declared a slave in a civil case. He had claimed to an officer that his master, Anthony Johnson, had held him past his indenture term. Johnson himself was a free black, who had arrived in Virginia in 1621 from Portuguese Angola. A neighbor, Robert Parker, told Johnson that if he did not release Casor, he would testify in court to this fact. Under local laws, Johnson was at risk for losing some of his headright lands for violating the terms of indenture. Under duress, Johnson freed Casor. Casor entered into a seven years' indenture with Parker. Feeling cheated, Johnson sued Parker to repossess Casor. A Northampton County, Virginia court ruled for Johnson, declaring that Parker illegally was detaining Casor from his rightful master who legally held him "for the duration of his life".

First inherited status laws

During the colonial period, the status of enslaved people was affected by interpretations related to the status of foreigners in England. England had no system of naturalizing immigrants to its island or its colonies. Since persons of African origins were not English subjects by birth, they were among those peoples considered foreigners and generally outside English common law. The colonies struggled with how to classify people born to foreigners and subjects. In 1656 Virginia, Elizabeth Key Grinstead, a mixed-race woman, successfully gained her freedom and that of her son in a challenge to her status by making her case as the baptized Christian daughter of the free Englishman Thomas Key. Her attorney was an English subject, which may have helped her case (he was also the father of her mixed-race son, and the couple married after Key was freed).

In 1662, shortly after the Elizabeth Key trial and similar challenges, the Virginia royal colony approved a law adopting the principle of partus sequitur ventrem (called partus, for short), stating that any children born in the colony would take the status of the mother. A child of an enslaved mother would be born into slavery, regardless if the father were a freeborn Englishman or Christian. This was a reversal of common law practice in England, which ruled that children of English subjects took the status of the father. The change institutionalized the skewed power relationships between those who enslaved people and enslaved women, freed white men from the legal responsibility to acknowledge or financially support their mixed-race children, and somewhat confined the open scandal of mixed-race children and miscegenation to within the slave quarters.

Increasing slave trade

In 1672, King Charles II rechartered the Royal African Company (it had initially been set up in 1660) as an English monopoly for the African slave and commodities trade. In 1698, by statute, the English parliament opened the trade to all English subjects. The trade of enslaved people to the mid-Atlantic colonies increased substantially in the 1680s, and, by 1710, the African population in Virginia had increased to 23,100 (42% of total); Maryland had 8,000 Africans (14.5% of total). In the early 18th century, England passed Spain and Portugal to become the world's leading trader of enslaved people. From the early 18th century British colonial merchants, especially in Charleston, South Carolina, challenged the monopoly of the Royal African Company, and Joseph Wragg and Benjamin Savage became the first independent traders of enslaved people to break through the monopoly by the 1730s.

First religious status laws
The Virginia slave codes of 1705 further defined as slaves those people imported from nations that were not Christian. Native Americans who were sold to colonists by other Native Americans (from rival tribes), or captured by Europeans during village raids, were also defined as slaves. This codified the earlier principle of non-Christian foreigner enslavement.

First anti-slavery causes

In 1735, the Georgia Trustees enacted a law prohibiting slavery in the new colony, which had been established in 1733 to enable the "worthy poor," as well as persecuted European Protestants, to have a new start. Slavery was then legal in the other 12 English colonies. Neighboring South Carolina had an economy based on the use of enslaved labor. The Georgia Trustees wanted to eliminate the risk of slave rebellions and make Georgia better able to defend against attacks from the Spanish to the south, who offered freedom to escaped enslaved people. James Edward Oglethorpe was the driving force behind the colony, and the only trustee to reside in Georgia. He opposed slavery on moral grounds as well as for pragmatic reasons, and vigorously defended the ban on slavery against fierce opposition from Carolina merchants of enslaved people and land speculators.

The Protestant Scottish highlanders who settled what is now Darien, Georgia, added a moral anti-slavery argument, which became increasingly rare in the South, in their 1739 "Petition of the Inhabitants of New Inverness". By 1750 Georgia authorized slavery in the colony because it had been unable to secure enough indentured servants as laborers. As economic conditions in England began to improve in the first half of the 18th century, workers had no reason to leave, especially to face the risks in the colonies.

Slavery in British colonies
During most of the British colonial period, slavery existed in all the colonies. People enslaved in the North typically worked as house servants, artisans, laborers and craftsmen, with the greater number in cities. Many men worked on the docks and in shipping. In 1703, more than 42% of New York City households enslaved people, the second-highest proportion of any city in the colonies, behind only Charleston, South Carolina. But enslaved people were also used as agricultural workers in farm communities, especially in the South, but also including in areas of upstate New York and Long Island, Connecticut, and New Jersey. By 1770, there were 397,924 blacks in a population of 2.17 million. They were unevenly distributed: There were 14,867 in New England, where they were 3% of the population; 34,679 in the mid-Atlantic colonies, where they were 6% of the population (19,000 were in New York or 11%); and 347,378 in the five Southern Colonies, where they were 31% of the population

The South developed an agricultural economy dependent on commodity crops. Its planters rapidly acquired a significantly higher number and proportion of enslaved people in the population overall, as its commodity crops were labor-intensive. Early on, enslaved people in the South worked primarily on farms and plantations growing indigo, rice and tobacco; cotton did not become a major crop until after the 1790s. Before then long-staple cotton was cultivated primarily on the Sea Islands of Georgia and South Carolina.

The invention of the cotton gin in 1793 enabled the cultivation of short-staple cotton in a wide variety of mainland areas, leading to the development of large areas of the Deep South as cotton country in the 19th century. Rice and tobacco cultivation were very labor-intensive. In 1720, about 65% of South Carolina's population was enslaved. Planters (defined by historians in the Upper South as those who held 20 or more slaves) used enslaved workers to cultivate commodity crops. They also worked in the artisanal trades on large plantations and in many Southern port cities. The later wave of settlers in the 18th century who settled along the Appalachian Mountains and backcountry were backwoods subsistence farmers, and they seldom held enslaved people.

Some of the British colonies attempted to abolish the international slave trade, fearing that the importation of new Africans would be disruptive. Virginia bills to that effect were vetoed by the British Privy Council. Rhode Island forbade the import of enslaved people in 1774. All of the colonies except Georgia had banned or limited the African slave trade by 1786; Georgia did so in 1798. Some of these laws were later repealed.

About 600,000 slaves were transported to the United States, or 5% of the twelve million slaves taken from Africa. About 310,000 of these persons were imported into the Thirteen Colonies before 1776: 40% directly and the rest from the Caribbean.

Slaves transported to the British colonies and United States:
 1620–1700......21,000
 1701–1760....189,000
 1761–1770......63,000
 1771–1790......56,000
 1791–1800......79,000
 1801–1810....124,000
 1810–1865......51,000
 Total .............597,000

They constituted less than 5% of the 12 million enslaved people brought from Africa to the Americas. The great majority of enslaved Africans were transported to sugar plantations in the Caribbean and to Portuguese Brazil. As life expectancy was short, their numbers had to be continually replenished. Life expectancy was much higher in the United States, and the enslaved population was successful in reproduction. The number of enslaved people in the United States grew rapidly, reaching  by the 1860 census. From 1770 to 1860, the rate of natural growth of North American enslaved people was much greater than for the population of any nation in Europe, and it was nearly twice as rapid as that of England.

The number of enslaved and free blacks rose from 759,000 (60,000 free) in the 1790 U.S. census to 4,450,000 (480,000, or 11%, free) in the 1860 U.S. census, a 580% increase. The white population grew from 3.2 million to 27 million, an increase of 1,180% due to high birth rates and 4.5 million immigrants, overwhelmingly from Europe, and 70% of whom arrived in the years 1840–1860. The percentage of the black population dropped from 19% to 14%, as follows: 1790: 757,208 .. 19% of population, of whom 697,681 (92%) were enslaved. 1860: 4,441,830 .. 14% of population, of whom 3,953,731 (89%) were enslaved.

Slavery in French Louisiana
Louisiana was founded as a French colony. Colonial officials in 1724 implemented Louis XIV of France's Code Noir, which regulated the slave trade and the institution of slavery in New France and the French West Indies. This resulted in Louisiana, which was purchased by the United States in 1803, having a different pattern of slavery than the rest of the United States. As written, the Code Noir gave some rights to slaves, including the right to marry. Although it authorized and codified cruel corporal punishment against slaves under certain conditions, it forbade slave owners from torturing them, separating married couples, or separating young children from their mothers. It also required owners to instruct slaves in the Catholic faith.

Together with a more permeable historic French system that allowed certain rights to gens de couleur libres (free people of color), who were often born to white fathers and their mixed-race concubines, a far higher percentage of African Americans in Louisiana were free as of the 1830 census (13.2% in Louisiana compared to 0.8% in Mississippi, whose population was dominated by white Anglo-Americans). Most of Louisiana's "third class" of free people of color, situated between the native-born French and mass of African slaves, lived in New Orleans. The Louisiana free people of color were often literate and educated, with a significant number owning businesses, properties, and even slaves. Although Code Noir forbade interracial marriages, interracial unions were widespread. Whether there was a formalized system of concubinage, known as plaçage, is subject to debate. The mixed-race offspring (Creoles of color) from these unions were among those in the intermediate social caste of free people of color. The English colonies, in contrast, operated within a binary system that treated mulatto and black slaves equally under the law and discriminated against free black people equally, without regard to their skin tone.

When the U.S. took over Louisiana, Americans from the Protestant South entered the territory and began to impose their norms. They officially discouraged interracial relationships (although white men continued to have unions with black women, both enslaved and free.) The "Americanization" of Louisiana gradually resulted in a binary system of race, causing free people of color to lose status as they were grouped with the slaves. They lost certain rights as they became classified by American whites as officially "black".

Revolutionary era

As historian Christopher L. Brown put it, slavery "had never been on the agenda in a serious way before," but the American Revolution "forced it to be a public question from there forward."

Freedom offered as incentive by British

Although a small number of African slaves were kept and sold in England and Scotland, slavery had not been authorized by statute in England, though it had been in Scotland. In 1772, in the case of Somerset v Stewart, it was found that slavery was no part of the common law in England and Wales, and therefore was not permitted. The British role in the international slave trade continued until it abolished its slave trade in 1807. Slavery flourished in most of Britain's North American and Caribbean colonies, with many wealthy slave owners living in England and wielding considerable power.

In early 1775 Lord Dunmore, royal governor of Virginia and a slave owner, wrote to Lord Dartmouth of his intention to free slaves owned by patriots in case of rebellion. On November 7, 1775, Lord Dunmore issued Lord Dunmore's Proclamation, which declared martial law in Virginia and promised freedom to any slaves of American patriots who would leave their masters and join the royal forces. Slaves owned by loyalist masters, however, were unaffected by Dunmore's Proclamation. About 1,500 slaves owned by patriots escaped and joined Dunmore's forces. Most died of disease before they could do any fighting, but three hundred of these freed slaves made it to freedom in Britain.

Many slaves took advantage of the disruption of war to escape from their plantations to British lines or to fade into the general population. Upon their first sight of British vessels, thousands of slaves in Maryland and Virginia fled from their owners. Throughout the South, losses of slaves were high, with many due to escapes. Slaves also escaped throughout New England and the mid-Atlantic, with many joining the British who had occupied New York. In the closing months of the war, the British evacuated freedmen and also removed slaves owned by loyalists. Around 15,000 black loyalists left with the British, most of them ending up as free people in England or its colonies. More than 3,000 were resettled in Nova Scotia, where they were eventually granted land and formed the community of the black Nova Scotians.

Slaves and free blacks who supported the rebellion

The rebels began to offer freedom as an incentive to motivate slaves to fight on their side. Washington authorized slaves to be freed who fought with the American Continental Army. Rhode Island started enlisting slaves in 1778, and promised compensation to owners whose slaves enlisted and survived to gain freedom. During the course of the war, about one-fifth of the Northern army was black. In 1781, Baron Closen, a German officer in the French Royal Deux-Ponts Regiment at the Battle of Yorktown, estimated the American army to be about one-quarter black. These men included both former slaves and free-born blacks. Thousands of free blacks in the Northern states fought in the state militias and Continental Army. In the South, both sides offered freedom to slaves who would perform military service. Roughly 20,000 slaves fought in the American Revolution.

The birth of abolitionism in the new United States
In the first two decades after the American Revolution, state legislatures and individuals took actions to free slaves. Northern states passed new constitutions that contained language about equal rights or specifically abolished slavery; some states, such as New York and New Jersey, where slavery was more widespread, passed laws by the end of the 18th century to abolish slavery incrementally. By 1804, all the Northern states had passed laws outlawing slavery, either immediately or over time. In New York, the last slaves were freed in 1827 (celebrated with a big July4 parade). Indentured servitude, which had been widespread in the colonies (half the population of Philadelphia had once been indentured servants), dropped dramatically, and disappeared by 1800. However, there were still forcibly indentured servants in New Jersey in 1860. No Southern state abolished slavery, but some individual owners, more than a handful, freed their slaves by personal decision, often providing for manumission in wills but sometimes filing deeds or court papers to free individuals. Numerous slaveholders who freed their slaves cited revolutionary ideals in their documents; others freed slaves as a promised reward for service. From 1790 to 1810, the proportion of blacks free in the United States increased from 8 to 13.5 percent, and in the Upper South from less than one to nearly ten percent as a result of these actions.

Starting in 1777, the rebels outlawed the importation of slaves state by state. They all acted to end the international trade, but, after the war, it was reopened in South Carolina and Georgia. In 1807, the United States Congress acted on President Thomas Jefferson's advice and, without controversy, made importing slaves from abroad a federal crime, effective the first day that the United States Constitution permitted this prohibition: January 1, 1808.

During the Revolution and in the following years, all states north of Maryland took steps towards abolishing slavery. In 1777, the Vermont Republic, which was still unrecognized by the United States, passed a state constitution prohibiting slavery. The Pennsylvania Abolition Society, led in part by Benjamin Franklin, was founded in 1775, and Pennsylvania began gradual abolition in 1780. In 1783, the Supreme Judicial Court of Massachusetts ruled in Commonwealth v. Jennison that slavery was unconstitutional under the state's new 1780 constitution. New Hampshire began gradual emancipation in 1783, while Connecticut and Rhode Island followed suit in 1784. The New York Manumission Society, which was led by John Jay, Alexander Hamilton and Aaron Burr, was founded in 1785. New York state began gradual emancipation in 1799, and New Jersey did the same in 1804.

Shortly after the Revolution, the Northwest Territory was established, by Manasseh Cutler and Rufus Putnam (who had been George Washington's chief engineer). Both Cutler and Putnam came from Puritan New England. The Puritans strongly believed that slavery was morally wrong. Their influence on the issue of slavery was long-lasting, and this was provided significantly greater impetus by the Revolution. The Northwest Territory (which became Ohio, Michigan, Indiana, Illinois, Wisconsin and part of Minnesota) doubled the size of the United States, and it was established at the insistence of Cutler and Putnam as "free soil"no slavery. This was to prove crucial a few decades later. Had those states been slave states, and their electoral votes gone to Abraham Lincoln's main opponent, Lincoln would not have become President. The Civil War would not have been fought. Even if it eventually had been, the North might well have lost.

Constitution of the United States

Slavery was a contentious issue in the writing and approval of the Constitution of the United States. The words "slave" and "slavery" did not appear in the Constitution as originally adopted, although several provisions clearly referred to slaves and slavery. Until the adoption of the 13th Amendment in 1865, the Constitution did not prohibit slavery.

Section 9 of Article I forbade the Federal government from preventing the importation of slaves, described as "such Persons as any of the States now existing shall think proper to admit", for twenty years after the Constitution's ratification (until January 1, 1808). The Act Prohibiting Importation of Slaves of 1807, adopted by Congress and signed into law by President Thomas Jefferson (who had called for its enactment in his 1806 State of the Union address), went into effect on January 1, 1808, the earliest date on which the importation of slaves could be prohibited under the Constitution.

The delegates approved the Fugitive Slave Clause of the Constitution (Article IV, section 2, clause 3), which prohibited states from freeing slaves who fled to them from another state and required that they be returned to their owners. The Fugitive Slave Act of 1793 and the Fugitive Slave Act of 1850 gave effect to the Fugitive Slave Clause.

Three-fifths Compromise

In a section negotiated by James Madison of Virginia, Section2 of ArticleI designated "other persons" (slaves) to be added to the total of the state's free population, at the rate of three-fifths of their total number, to establish the state's official population for the purposes of apportionment of congressional representation and federal taxation. The "Three-Fifths Compromise" was reached after a debate in which delegates from Southern (slaveholding) states argued that slaves should be counted in the census just as all other persons were while delegates from Northern (free) states countered that slaves should not be counted at all.  The compromise strengthened the political power of Southern states, as three-fifths of the (non-voting) slave population was counted for congressional apportionment and in the Electoral College, although it did not strengthen Southern states as much as it would have had the Constitution provided for counting all persons, whether slave or free, equally.

In addition, many parts of the country were tied to the Southern economy. As the historian James Oliver Horton noted, prominent slaveholder politicians and the commodity crops of the South had a strong influence on United States politics and economy. Horton said,

in the 72 years between the election of George Washington and the election of Abraham Lincoln, 50 of those years [had] a slaveholder as president of the United States, and, for that whole period of time, there was never a person elected to a second term who was not a slaveholder.

The power of Southern states in Congress lasted until the Civil War, affecting national policies, legislation, and appointments. One result was that justices appointed to the Supreme Court were also primarily slave owners. The planter elite dominated the Southern congressional delegations and the United States presidency for nearly fifty years.

1790 to 1860

Slave trade

The U.S. Constitution barred the federal government from prohibiting the importation of slaves for twenty years. Various states passed bans on the international slave trade during that period; by 1808, the only state still allowing the importation of African slaves was South Carolina. After 1808, legal importation of slaves ceased, although there was smuggling via Spanish Florida and the disputed Gulf Coast to the west. This route all but ended after Florida became a U.S. territory in 1821 (but see slave ships Wanderer and Clotilda).

The replacement for the importation of slaves from abroad was increased domestic production. Virginia and Maryland had little new agricultural development, and their need for slaves was mostly for replacements for decedents. Normal reproduction more than supplied these: Virginia and Maryland had surpluses of slaves. Their tobacco farms were "worn out" and the climate was not suitable for cotton or sugar cane. The surplus was even greater because slaves were encouraged to reproduce (though they could not marry). The pro-slavery Virginian Thomas Roderick Dew wrote in 1832 that Virginia was a "negro-raising state"; i.e. Virginia "produced" slaves. According to him, in 1832 Virginia exported "upwards of 6,000 slaves" per year, "a source of wealth to Virginia". A newspaper from 1836 gives the figure as 40,000, earning for Virginia an estimated $24,000,000 per year. Demand for slaves was the strongest in what was then the southwest of the country: Alabama, Mississippi, and Louisiana, and, later, Texas, Arkansas, and Missouri. Here there was abundant land suitable for plantation agriculture, which young men with some capital established. This was expansion of the white, monied population: younger men seeking their fortune.

The most valuable crop that could be grown on a plantation in that climate was cotton. That crop was labor-intensive, and the least-costly laborers were slaves. Demand for slaves exceeded the supply in the southwest; therefore slaves, never cheap if they were productive, went for a higher price. As portrayed in Uncle Tom's Cabin (the "original" cabin was in Maryland), "selling South" was greatly feared. A recently (2018) publicized example of the practice of "selling South" is the 1838 sale by Jesuits of 272 slaves from Maryland, to plantations in Louisiana, to benefit Georgetown University, which has been described as "ow[ing] its existence" to this transaction.

Traders responded to the demand, including John Armfield and his uncle Isaac Franklin, who were "reputed to have made over half a million dollars (in 19th-century value)" in the slave trade.

"Fancy ladies"

In the United States in the early 19th century, owners of female slaves could freely and legally use them as sexual objects. This follows free use of female slaves on slaving vessels by the crews.
The slaveholder has it in his power, to violate the chastity of his slaves. And not a few are beastly enough to exercise such power. Hence it happens that, in some families, it is difficult to distinguish the free children from the slaves. It is sometimes the case, that the largest part of the master's own children are born, not of his wife, but of the wives and daughters
of his slaves, whom he has basely prostituted as well as enslaved.
"This vice, this bane of society, has already become so common, that it is scarcely esteemed a disgrace."

"Fancy" was a code word which indicated that the girl or young woman was suitable for or trained for sexual use. In some cases, children were also abused in this manner. The sale of a 13-year-old "nearly a fancy" is documented. Zephaniah Kingsley, Jr., bought his wife when she was 13.

Furthermore, enslaved women who were old enough to bear children were encouraged to procreate, which raised their value as slaves, since their children would eventually provide labor or be sold, enriching the owners. Enslaved women were sometimes medically treated to enable or encourage their fertility. The variations in skin color found in the United States make it obvious how often black women were impregnated by whites. For example, in the 1850 Census, 75.4% of "free negros" in Florida were described as mulattos, of mixed race. Nevertheless, it is only very recently, with DNA studies, that any sort of reliable number can be provided, and the research has only begun. Light-skinned girls, who contrasted with the darker field workers, were preferred.

As Caroline Randall Williams was quoted in The New York Times: "You Want a Confederate Monument? My Body Is a Confederate Monument." "I have rape-colored skin," she added.

The sexual use of black slaves by either slave owners or by those who could purchase the temporary services of a slave took various forms. A slaveowner, or his teenage son, could go to the slave quarters area of the plantation and do what he wanted, with minimal privacy if any. It was common for a "house" female (housekeeper, maid, cook, laundress, or nanny) to be raped by one or more members of the household. Houses of prostitution throughout the slave states were largely staffed by female slaves providing sexual services, to their owners' profit. There were a small number of free black females engaged in prostitution, or concubinage, especially in New Orleans.

Slave owners who engaged in sexual activity with female slaves "were often the elite of the community. They had little need to worry about public scorn." These relationships "appear to have been tolerated and in some cases even quietly accepted." "Southern women... do not trouble themselves about it". Franklin and Armfield, who were definitely the elite of the community, joked frequently in their letters about the black women and girls that they were raping. It never occurred to them that there was anything wrong in what they were doing.

Light-skinned young girls were sold openly for sexual use; their price was much higher than that of a field hand. Special markets for the fancy girl trade existed in New Orleans and Lexington, Kentucky. Historian Philip Shaw describes an occasion when Abraham Lincoln and Allen Gentry witnessed such sales in New Orleans in 1828:

Those girls who were "considered educated and refined, were purchased by the wealthiest clients, usually plantation owners, to become personal sexual companions". "There was a great demand in New Orleans for 'fancy girls'."

The issue which did come up frequently was the threat of sexual intercourse between black males and white females. Just as the black women were perceived as having "a trace of Africa, that supposedly incited passion and sexual wantonness", the men were perceived as savages, unable to control their lust, given an opportunity.

Another approach to the question was offered by Quaker and Florida planter Zephaniah Kingsley, Jr. He advocated, and personally practiced, deliberate racial mixing through marriage, as part of his proposed solution to the slavery issue: racial integration, called "amalgamation" at the time. In an 1829 Treatise, he stated that mixed-race people were healthier and often more beautiful, that interracial sex was hygienic, and slavery made it convenient. Because of these views, tolerated in Spanish Florida, he found it impossible to remain long in Territorial Florida, and moved with his slaves and multiple wives to a plantation, Mayorasgo de Koka, in Haiti (now in the Dominican Republic). There were many others who less flagrantly practiced interracial, common-law marriages with slaves (see Partus sequitur ventrem).

Justifications in the South

"A necessary evil"
In the 19th century, proponents of slavery often defended the institution as a "necessary evil". At that time, it was feared that emancipation of black slaves would have more harmful social and economic consequences than the continuation of slavery. On April 22, 1820, Thomas Jefferson, one of the Founding Fathers of the United States, wrote in a letter to John Holmes, that with slavery,

The French writer and traveler Alexis de Tocqueville, in his influential Democracy in America (1835), expressed opposition to slavery while observing its effects on American society. He felt that a multiracial society without slavery was untenable, as he believed that prejudice against blacks increased as they were granted more rights (for example, in northern states). He believed that the attitudes of white Southerners, and the concentration of the black population in the South, were bringing the white and black populations to a state of equilibrium, and were a danger to both races. Because of the racial differences between master and slave, he believed that the latter could not be emancipated.

In a letter to his wife dated December 27, 1856, in reaction to a message from President Franklin Pierce, Robert E. Lee wrote,

"A positive good"

However, as the abolitionist movement's agitation increased and the area developed for plantations expanded, apologies for slavery became more faint in the South. Leaders then described slavery as a beneficial scheme of labor management. John C. Calhoun, in a famous speech in the Senate in 1837, declared that slavery was "instead of an evil, a gooda positive good". Calhoun supported his view with the following reasoning: in every civilized society one portion of the community must live on the labor of another; learning, science, and the arts are built upon leisure; the African slave, kindly treated by his master and mistress and looked after in his old age, is better off than the free laborers of Europe; and under the slave system conflicts between capital and labor are avoided. The advantages of slavery in this respect, he concluded, "will become more and more manifest, if left undisturbed by interference from without, as the country advances in wealth and numbers".

South Carolina army officer, planter and railroad executive James Gadsden called slavery "a social blessing" and abolitionists "the greatest curse of the nation". Gadsden was in favor of South Carolina's secession in 1850, and was a leader in efforts to split California into two states, one slave and one free.

Other Southern writers who also began to portray slavery as a positive good were James Henry Hammond and George Fitzhugh. They presented several arguments to defend the practice of slavery in the South. Hammond, like Calhoun, believed that slavery was needed to build the rest of society. In a speech to the Senate on March 4, 1858, Hammond developed his "Mudsill Theory," defending his view on slavery by stating: "Such a class you must have, or you would not have that other class which leads progress, civilization, and refinement. It constitutes the very mud-sill of society and of political government; and you might as well attempt to build a house in the air, as to build either the one or the other, except on this mud-sill." Hammond believed that in every class one group must accomplish all the menial duties, because without them the leaders in society could not progress. He argued that the hired laborers of the North were slaves too: "The difference... is, that our slaves are hired for life and well compensated; there is no starvation, no begging, no want of employment," while those in the North had to search for employment.

George Fitzhugh used assumptions about white superiority to justify slavery, writing that, "the Negro is but a grown up child, and must be governed as a child." In The Universal Law of Slavery, Fitzhugh argues that slavery provides everything necessary for life and that the slave is unable to survive in a free world because he is lazy, and cannot compete with the intelligent European white race. He states that "The negro slaves of the South are the happiest, and in some sense, the freest people in the world." Without the South, "He (slave) would become an insufferable burden to society" and "Society has the right to prevent this, and can only do so by subjecting him to domestic slavery."

On March 21, 1861, Alexander Stephens, Vice President of the Confederacy, delivered his Cornerstone Speech. He explained the differences between the Constitution of the Confederate States and the United States Constitution, laid out the cause for the American Civil War, as he saw it, and defended slavery:

This view of the Negro "race" was backed by pseudoscience. The leading researcher was Dr. Samuel A. Cartwright, inventor of the mental illnesses of drapetomania (the desire of a slave to run away) and dysaesthesia aethiopica ("rascality"), both cured by whipping. The Medical Association of Louisiana set up a committee, of which he was chair, to investigate "the Diseases and Physical Peculiarities of the Negro Race". Their report, first delivered to the Medical Association in an address, was published in their journal, and then reprinted in part in the widely circulated DeBow's Review.

Proposed expansion of slavery
Whether or not slavery was to be limited to the Southern states that already had it, or whether it was to be permitted in new states made from the lands of the Louisiana Purchase and Mexican Cession, was a major issue in the 1840s and 1850s. Results included the Compromise of 1850 and the Bleeding Kansas period.

Also relatively well known are the proposals, including the Ostend Manifesto, to annex Cuba as a slave state. There was also talk of making slave states of Mexico, Nicaragua (see Walker affair) and other lands around the so-called Golden Circle. Less well known today (2019), though well known at the time, is that pro-slavery Southerners:
 Spoke openly of their desire to reopen the Atlantic slave trade (see Act Prohibiting Importation of Slaves#Antebellum proposals by Fire-Eaters to reopen).
 Wanted to reintroduce slavery in the Northern states, through federal action or Constitutional amendment making slavery legal nationwide, thus overriding state anti-slavery laws. (See Crittenden Compromise.) This was described as "well underway" by 1858.
 Said openly that slavery should by no means be limited to Negros, since in their view it was beneficial. Northern white workers, who were allegedly "wage slaves" already, would allegedly have better lives if they were enslaved.

None of these ideas got very far, but they alarmed Northerners and contributed to the growing polarization of the country.

Abolitionism in the North

Beginning during the Revolution and in the first two decades of the postwar era, every state in the North abolished slavery. These were the first abolitionist laws in the Atlantic World. However, the abolition of slavery did not necessarily mean that existing slaves became free. In some states they were forced to remain with their former owners as indentured servants: free in name only, although they could not be sold and thus families could not be split, and their children were born free. The end of slavery did not come in New York until July 4, 1827, when it was celebrated with a big parade. However, in the 1830 census, the only state with no slaves was Vermont. In the 1840 census, there were still slaves in New Hampshire (1), Rhode Island (5), Connecticut (17), New York (4), Pennsylvania (64), Ohio (3), Indiana (3), Illinois (331), Iowa (16), and Wisconsin (11). There were none in these states in the 1850 census.

In Massachusetts, slavery was successfully challenged in court in 1783 in a freedom suit by Quock Walker; he said that slavery was in contradiction to the state's new constitution of 1780 providing for equality of men. Freed slaves were subject to racial segregation and discrimination in the North, and in many cases they did not have the right to vote until ratification of the Fifteenth Amendment in 1870.

Most Northern states passed legislation for gradual abolition, first freeing children born to slave mothers (and requiring them to serve lengthy indentures to their mother's owners, often into their 20s as young adults). In 1845, the Supreme Court of New Jersey received lengthy arguments towards "the deliverance of four thousand persons from bondage". Pennsylvania's last slaves were freed in 1847, Connecticut's in 1848, and while neither New Hampshire nor New Jersey had any slaves in the 1850 Census, and New Jersey only one and New Hampshire none in the 1860 Census, slavery was never prohibited in either state until ratification of the 13th Amendment in 1865 (and New Jersey was one of the last states to ratify it).

None of the Southern states abolished slavery before 1865, but it was not unusual for individual slaveholders in the South to free numerous slaves, often citing revolutionary ideals, in their wills. Methodist, Quaker, and Baptist preachers traveled in the South, appealing to slaveholders to manumit their slaves, and there were "manumission societies" in some Southern states. By 1810, the number and proportion of free blacks in the population of the United States had risen dramatically. Most free blacks lived in the North, but even in the Upper South, the proportion of free blacks went from less than one percent of all blacks to more than ten percent, even as the total number of slaves was increasing through imports.

One of the early Puritan writings on this subject was "The Selling of Joseph," by Samuel Sewall in 1700. In it, Sewall condemned slavery and the slave trade and refuted many of the era's typical justifications for slavery. The Puritan influence on slavery was still strong at the time of the American Revolution and up until the Civil War. Of America's first seven presidents, the two who did not own slaves, John Adams and John Quincy Adams, came from Puritan New England. They were wealthy enough to own slaves, but they chose not to because they believed that it was morally wrong to do so. In 1765, colonial leader Samuel Adams and his wife were given a slave girl as a gift. They immediately freed her. Just after the Revolution, in 1787, the Northwest Territory (which became the states of Ohio, Michigan, Indiana, Illinois, Wisconsin and part of Minnesota) was opened up for settlement. The two men responsible for establishing this territory were Manasseh Cutler and Rufus Putnam. They came from Puritan New England, and they insisted that this new territory, which doubled the size of the United States, was going to be "free soil"no slavery. This was to prove crucial in the coming decades. If those states had become slave states, and their electoral votes had gone to Abraham Lincoln's main opponent, Lincoln would not have been elected president. The Civil War would not have been fought. Even if it eventually had been, the North would likely have lost.

In the decades leading up to the Civil War, the abolitionists, such as Theodore Parker, Ralph Waldo Emerson, Henry David Thoreau and Frederick Douglass, repeatedly used the Puritan heritage of the country to bolster their cause. The most radical anti-slavery newspaper, The Liberator, invoked the Puritans and Puritan values over a thousand times. Parker, in urging New England Congressmen to support the abolition of slavery, wrote that "The son of the Puritan... is sent to Congress to stand up for Truth and Right..."

Northerners predominated in the westward movement into the Midwestern territory after the American Revolution; as the states were organized, they voted to prohibit slavery in their constitutions when they achieved statehood: Ohio in 1803, Indiana in 1816 and Illinois in 1818. What developed was a Northern block of free states united into one contiguous geographic area that generally shared an anti-slavery culture. The exceptions were the areas along the Ohio River settled by Southerners: the southern portions of Indiana, Ohio and Illinois. Residents of those areas generally shared in Southern culture and attitudes. In addition, these areas were devoted to agriculture longer than the industrializing northern parts of these states, and some farmers used slave labor. In Illinois, for example, while the trade in slaves was prohibited, it was legal to bring slaves from Kentucky into Illinois and use them there, as long as the slaves left Illinois one day per year (they were "visiting"). The emancipation of slaves in the North led to the growth in the population of Northern free blacks, from several hundred in the 1770s to nearly 50,000 by 1810.

Agitation against slavery

There was legal agitation against slavery in the Thirteen Colonies starting in 1752 by lawyer Benjamin Kent, whose cases were recorded by one of his understudies, the future president John Adams. Kent represented numerous slaves in their attempts to gain their freedom. He handled the case of a slave, Pompey, suing his master. In 1766, Kent was the first lawyer in the United States to win a case to free a slave, Jenny Slew. He also won a trial in the Old County Courthouse for a slave named  (1771). Kent also handled Lucy Pernam's divorce and the freedom suits of Rose and Salem Orne.

Throughout the first half of the 19th century, abolitionism, a movement to end slavery, grew in strength; most abolitionist societies and supporters were in the North. They worked to raise awareness about the evils of slavery, and to build support for abolition.

This struggle took place amid strong support for slavery among white Southerners, who profited greatly from the system of enslaved labor. But slavery was entwined with the national economy; for instance, the banking, shipping, and manufacturing industries of New York City all had strong economic interests in slavery, as did similar industries in other major port cities in the North. The Northern textile mills in New York and New England processed Southern cotton and manufactured clothes to outfit slaves. By 1822, half of New York City's exports were related to cotton.

Slaveholders began to refer to slavery as the "peculiar institution" to differentiate it from other examples of forced labor. They justified it as less cruel than the free labor of the North.

The principal organized bodies to advocate abolition and anti-slavery reforms in the north were the Pennsylvania Abolition Society and the New York Manumission Society. Before the 1830s the antislavery groups called for gradual emancipation. By the late 1820s, under the impulse of religious evangelicals such as Beriah Green, the sense emerged that owning slaves was a sin and the owner had to immediately free himself from this grave sin by immediate emancipation.

Colonization movement

In the early part of the 19th century, other organizations were founded to take action on the future of black Americans. Some advocated removing free black people from the United States to places where they would enjoy greater freedom; some endorsed colonization in Africa, while others advocated emigration, usually to Haiti. During the 1820s and 1830s, the American Colonization Society (ACS) was the primary organization to implement the "return" of black Americans to Africa. The ACS was made up mostly of Quakers and slaveholders, and they found uneasy common ground in support of what was incorrectly called "repatriation". By this time, however, most black Americans were native-born and did not want to emigrate, saying they were no more African than white Americans were British. Rather, they wanted full rights in the United States, where their families had lived and worked for generations.

In 1822, the ACS and affiliated state societies established what would become the colony of Liberia, in West Africa. The ACS assisted thousands of freedmen and free blacks (with legislated limits) to emigrate there from the United States. Many white people considered this preferable to emancipation in the United States. Henry Clay, one of the founders and a prominent slaveholder politician from Kentucky, said that blacks faced

unconquerable prejudice resulting from their color, they never could amalgamate with the free whites of this country. It was desirable, therefore, as it respected them, and the residue of the population of the country, to drain them off.

Deportation would also be a way to prevent reprisals against former slaveholders and white people in general, as had occurred in the 1804 Haiti massacre. After 1830, abolitionist and newspaper publisher William Lloyd Garrison promoted emancipation, characterizing slaveholding as a personal sin. He demanded that slaveowners repent and start the process of emancipation. His position increased defensiveness on the part of some Southerners, who noted the long history of slavery among many cultures. A few abolitionists, such as John Brown, favored the use of armed force to foment uprisings among the slaves, as he attempted to do at Harper's Ferry. Most abolitionists tried to raise public support to change laws and to challenge slave laws. Abolitionists were active on the lecture circuit in the North, and often featured escaped slaves in their presentations. Writer and orator Frederick Douglass became an important abolitionist leader after escaping from slavery. Harriet Beecher Stowe's novel Uncle Tom's Cabin (1852) was an international bestseller and aroused popular sentiment against slavery. It also provoked the publication of numerous anti-Tom novels by Southerners in the years before the American Civil War.

Prohibiting the international trade

Under the Constitution, Congress could not prohibit the import slave trade that was allowed in South Carolina until 1808. However, the third Congress regulated against it in the Slave Trade Act of 1794, which prohibited American shipbuilding and outfitting for the trade. Subsequent acts in 1800 and 1803 sought to discourage the trade by banning American investment in the trade, and American employment on ships in the trade, as well as prohibiting importation into states that had abolished slavery, which all states except South Carolina had by 1807. The final Act Prohibiting Importation of Slaves was adopted in 1807 and went into effect in 1808. However, illegal importation of African slaves (smuggling) was common. The Cuban slave trade between 1796 and 1807 was dominated by American slave ships. Despite the 1794 Act, Rhode Island slave ship owners found ways to continue supplying the slave-owning states. The overall U.S. slave-ship fleet in 1806 was estimated to be almost 75% the size of that of the British.

After Great Britain and the United States outlawed the international slave trade in 1807, British slave trade suppression activities began in 1808 through diplomatic efforts and the formation of the Royal Navy's West Africa Squadron in 1809. The United States denied the Royal Navy the right to stop and search U.S. ships suspected as slave ships, so not only were American ships unhindered by British patrols, but slavers from other countries would fly the American flag to try to avoid being stopped. Co-operation between the United States and Britain was not possible during the War of 1812 or the period of poor relations in the following years. In 1820, the United States Navy sent , under the command of Captain Trenchard, to patrol the slave coasts of West Africa. Cyane seized four American slave ships in her first year on station. Trenchard developed a good level of co-operation with the Royal Navy. Four additional U.S. warships were sent to the African coast in 1820 and 1821. A total of 11 American slave ships were taken by the U.S. Navy over this period. Then American enforcement activity reduced. There was still no agreement between the United States and Britain on a mutual right to board suspected slave traders sailing under each other's flag. Attempts to reach such an agreement stalled in 1821 and 1824 in the United States Senate. A U.S. Navy presence, however sporadic, did result in American slavers sailing under the Spanish flag, but still as an extensive trade. The Webster-Ashburton Treaty of 1842 set a guaranteed minimum level of patrol activity by the U.S. Navy and the Royal Navy, and formalized the level of co-operation that had existed in 1820. Its effects, however, were minimal while opportunities for greater co-operation were not taken. The U.S. transatlantic slave trade was not effectively suppressed until 1861, during Lincoln's presidency, when a treaty with Britain was signed whose provisions included allowing the Royal Navy to board, search and arrest slavers operating under the American flag.

Post-revolution Southern manumissions
Although Virginia, Maryland and Delaware were slave states, the latter two already had a high proportion of free blacks by the outbreak of war. Following the Revolution, the three legislatures made manumission easier, allowed by deed or will. Quaker and Methodist ministers particularly urged slaveholders to free their slaves. The number and proportion of freed slaves in these states rose dramatically until 1810. More than half of the number of free blacks in the United States were concentrated in the Upper South. The proportion of free blacks among the black population in the Upper South rose from less than 1% in 1792 to more than 10% by 1810. In Delaware, nearly 75% of blacks were free by 1810.

In the United States as a whole, the number of free blacks reached 186,446, or 13.5% of all blacks, by 1810. After that period, few slaves were freed, as the development of cotton plantations featuring short-staple cotton in the Deep South drove up the internal demand for slaves in the domestic slave trade and high prices being paid for them.

South Carolina made manumission more difficult, requiring legislative approval of every instance of manumission. Several Southern states required manumitted slaves to leave the state within thirty days.

Domestic slave trade and forced migration

The growing international demand for cotton led many plantation owners further west in search of suitable land. In addition, the invention of the cotton gin in 1793 enabled profitable processing of short-staple cotton, which could readily be grown in the uplands. The invention revolutionized the cotton industry by increasing fifty-fold the quantity of cotton that could be processed in a day. At the end of the War of 1812, fewer than 300,000 bales of cotton were produced nationally. By 1820, the amount of cotton produced had increased to 600,000 bales, and by 1850 it had reached 4,000,000. There was an explosive growth of cotton cultivation throughout the Deep South and greatly increased demand for slave labor to support it. As a result, manumissions decreased dramatically in the South.

Most of the slaves sold from the Upper South were from Maryland, Virginia and the Carolinas, where changes in agriculture decreased the need for their labor and the demand for slaves. Before 1810, primary destinations for the slaves who were sold were Kentucky and Tennessee, but, after 1810, the Deep South states of Georgia, Alabama, Mississippi, Louisiana and Texas received the most slaves. This is where cotton became "king." Meanwhile, the Upper South states of Kentucky and Tennessee joined the slave-exporting states.

By 1815, the domestic slave trade had become a major economic activity in the United States; it lasted until the 1860s. Between 1830 and 1840, nearly 250,000 slaves were taken across state lines. In the 1850s, more than 193,000 enslaved persons were transported, and historians estimate nearly one million in total took part in the forced migration of this new "Middle Passage." By 1860, the slave population in the United States had reached four million. Of the 1,515,605 free families in the fifteen slave states in 1860, nearly 400,000 held slaves (roughly one in four, or 25%), amounting to 8% of all American families.

The historian Ira Berlin called this forced migration of slaves the "Second Middle Passage" because it reproduced many of the same horrors as the Middle Passage (the name given to the transportation of slaves from Africa to North America). These sales of slaves broke up many families and caused much hardship. Characterizing it as the "central event" in the life of a slave between the American Revolution and the Civil War, Berlin wrote that, whether slaves were directly uprooted or lived in fear that they or their families would be involuntarily moved, "the massive deportation traumatized black people, both slave and free." Individuals lost their connection to families and clans. Added to the earlier colonists combining slaves from different tribes, many ethnic Africans lost their knowledge of varying tribal origins in Africa. Most were descended from families that had been in the United States for many generations.

The firm of Franklin and Armfield was a leader in this trade. In the 1840s, almost 300,000 slaves were transported, with Alabama and Mississippi receiving 100,000 each. During each decade between 1810 and 1860, at least 100,000 slaves were moved from their state of origin. In the final decade before the Civil War, 250,000 were transported. Michael Tadman wrote in Speculators and Slaves: Masters, Traders, and Slaves in the Old South (1989) that 60–70% of inter-regional migrations were the result of the sale of slaves. In 1820, a slave child in the Upper South had a 30% chance of being sold South by 1860. The death rate for the slaves on their way to their new destination across the American South was less than that suffered by captives shipped across the Atlantic Ocean, but mortality nevertheless was higher than the normal death rate.

Slave traders transported two-thirds of the slaves who moved West. Only a minority moved with their families and existing master. Slave traders had little interest in purchasing or transporting intact slave families; in the early years, planters demanded only the young male slaves needed for heavy labor. Later, in the interest of creating a "self-reproducing labor force", planters purchased nearly equal numbers of men and women. Berlin wrote:

The internal slave trade became the largest enterprise in the South outside the plantation itself, and probably the most advanced in its employment of modern transportation, finance, and publicity. The slave trade industry developed its own unique language, with terms such as "prime hands, bucks, breeding wenches, and "fancy girls" coming into common use.

The expansion of the interstate slave trade contributed to the "economic revival of once depressed seaboard states" as demand accelerated the value of slaves who were subject to sale.

Some traders moved their "chattels" by sea, with Norfolk to New Orleans being the most common route, but most slaves were forced to walk overland. Others were shipped downriver from such markets as Louisville on the Ohio River, and Natchez on the Mississippi. Traders created regular migration routes served by a network of slave pens, yards and warehouses needed as temporary housing for the slaves. In addition, other vendors provided clothes, food and supplies for slaves. As the trek advanced, some slaves were sold and new ones purchased. Berlin concluded, "In all, the slave trade, with its hubs and regional centers, its spurs and circuits, reached into every cranny of southern society. Few southerners, black or white, were untouched."

Once the trip ended, slaves faced a life on the frontier significantly different from most labor in the Upper South. Clearing trees and starting crops on virgin fields was harsh and backbreaking work. A combination of inadequate nutrition, bad water and exhaustion from both the journey and the work weakened the newly arrived slaves and produced casualties. New plantations were located at rivers' edges for ease of transportation and travel. Mosquitoes and other environmental challenges spread disease, which took the lives of many slaves. They had acquired only limited immunities to lowland diseases in their previous homes. The death rate was so high that, in the first few years of hewing a plantation out of the wilderness, some planters preferred whenever possible to use rented slaves rather than their own.

The harsh conditions on the frontier increased slave resistance and led owners and overseers to rely on violence for control. Many of the slaves were new to cotton fields and unaccustomed to the "sunrise-to-sunset gang labor" required by their new life. Slaves were driven much harder than when they had been in growing tobacco or wheat back East. Slaves had less time and opportunity to improve the quality of their lives by raising their own livestock or tending vegetable gardens, for either their own consumption or trade, as they could in the East.

In Louisiana, French colonists had established sugar cane plantations and exported sugar as the chief commodity crop. After the Louisiana Purchase in 1803, Americans entered the state and joined the sugar cultivation. Between 1810 and 1830, planters bought slaves from the North and the number of slaves increased from fewer than 10,000 to more than 42,000. Planters preferred young males, who represented two-thirds of the slave purchases. Dealing with sugar cane was even more physically demanding than growing cotton. The largely young, unmarried male slave force made the reliance on violence by the owners "especially savage".

New Orleans became nationally important as a slave market and port, as slaves were shipped from there upriver by steamboat to plantations on the Mississippi River; it also sold slaves who had been shipped downriver from markets such as Louisville. By 1840, it had the largest slave market in North America. It became the wealthiest and the fourth-largest city in the nation, based chiefly on the slave trade and associated businesses. The trading season was from September to May, after the harvest.

Slave traders were men of low reputation, even in the South. In the 1828 presidential election, candidate Andrew Jackson was strongly criticized by opponents as a slave trader who transacted in slaves in defiance of modern standards or morality.

Treatment

 
The treatment of slaves in the United States varied widely depending on conditions, time, and place, but in general it was brutal, especially on plantations. Whippings and rape were routine. The power relationships of slavery corrupted many whites who had authority over slaves, with children showing their own cruelty. Masters and overseers resorted to physical punishments to impose their wills. Slaves were punished by whipping, shackling, hanging, beating, burning, mutilation, branding and imprisonment. Punishment was most often meted out in response to disobedience or perceived infractions, but sometimes abuse was carried out to re-assert the dominance of the master or overseer of the slave. Treatment was usually harsher on large plantations, which were often managed by overseers and owned by absentee slaveholders, conditions permitting abuses.

William Wells Brown, who escaped to freedom, reported that on one plantation, slave men were required to pick eighty pounds per day of cotton, while women were required to pick seventy pounds; if any slave failed in his or her quota, they were subject to whip lashes for each pound they were short. The whipping post stood next to the cotton scales. A New York man who attended a slave auction in the mid-19th century reported that at least three-quarters of the male slaves he saw at sale had scars on their backs from whipping. By contrast, small slave-owning families had closer relationships between the owners and slaves; this sometimes resulted in a more humane environment but was not a given.

Historian Lawrence M. Friedman wrote: "Ten Southern codes made it a crime to mistreat a slave.... Under the Louisiana Civil Code of 1825 (art. 192), if a master was "convicted of cruel treatment", the judge could order the sale of the mistreated slave, presumably to a better master. Masters and overseers were seldom prosecuted under these laws. No slave could give testimony in the courts.

According to Adalberto Aguirre's research, 1,161 slaves were executed in the United States between the 1790s and 1850s. Quick executions of innocent slaves as well as suspects typically followed any attempted slave rebellions, as white militias overreacted with widespread killings that expressed their fears of rebellions, or suspected rebellions.

Although most slaves had lives that were very restricted in terms of their movements and agency, exceptions existed to virtually every generalization; for instance, there were also slaves who had considerable freedom in their daily lives: slaves allowed to rent out their labor and who might live independently of their master in cities, slaves who employed white workers, and slave doctors who treated upper-class white patients. After 1820, in response to the inability to import new slaves from Africa and in part to abolitionist criticism, some slaveholders improved the living conditions of their slaves, to encourage them to be productive and to try to prevent escapes. It was part of a paternalistic approach in the antebellum era that was encouraged by ministers trying to use Christianity to improve the treatment of slaves. Slaveholders published articles in Southern agricultural journals to share best practices in treatment and management of slaves; they intended to show that their system was better than the living conditions of northern industrial workers.

Medical care for slaves was limited in terms of the medical knowledge available to anyone. It was generally provided by other slaves or by slaveholders' family members, although sometimes "plantation physicians", like J. Marion Sims, were called by the owners to protect their investment by treating sick slaves. Many slaves possessed medical skills needed to tend to each other, and used folk remedies brought from Africa. They also developed new remedies based on American plants and herbs.

An estimated nine percent of slaves were disabled due to a physical, sensory, psychological, neurological, or developmental condition. However, slaves were often described as disabled if they were unable to work or bear a child, and were often subjected to harsh treatment as a result.

According to Andrew Fede, an owner could be held criminally liable for killing a slave only if the slave he killed was "completely submissive and under the master's absolute control". For example, in 1791 the North Carolina General Assembly defined the willful killing of a slave as criminal murder, unless done in resisting or under moderate correction (that is, corporal punishment).

Because of the power relationships at work, slave women in the United States were at high risk for rape and sexual abuse. Their children were repeatedly taken away from them and sold as farm animals; usually they never saw each other again. Many slaves fought back against sexual attacks, and some died resisting. Others carried psychological and physical scars from the attacks. Sexual abuse of slaves was partially rooted in a patriarchal Southern culture that treated black women as property or chattel. Southern culture strongly policed against sexual relations between white women and black men on the purported grounds of racial purity but, by the late 18th century, the many mixed-race slaves and slave children showed that white men had often taken advantage of slave women. Wealthy planter widowers, notably such as John Wayles and his son-in-law Thomas Jefferson, took slave women as concubines; each had six children with his partner: Elizabeth Hemings and her daughter Sally Hemings (the half-sister of Jefferson's late wife), respectively. Both Mary Chesnut and Fanny Kemble, wives of planters, wrote about this issue in the antebellum South in the decades before the Civil War. Sometimes planters used mixed-race slaves as house servants or favored artisans because they were their children or other relatives. There are many documented instances of "breeding farms" in the United States where slaves were forced to conceive and birth as many new slaves as possible. The largest breeding farms were located in the states of Virginia and Maryland. As a result of centuries of slavery and such relationships, DNA studies have shown that the vast majority of African Americans also have historic European ancestry, generally through paternal lines.

While slaves' living conditions were poor by modern standards, Robert Fogel argued that all workers, free or slave, during the first half of the 19th century were subject to hardship. Unlike free individuals, however, enslaved people were far more likely to be underfed, physically punished, sexually abused, or killed, with no recourse, legal or otherwise, against those who perpetrated these crimes against them.

In a very grim fashion, the commodification of the human body was legal in the case of African slaves as they were not legally seen as fully human. For the reason of slave punishment, decoration, or self-expression, the skin of slaves was in many instances allowed to be made into leather for furniture, accessories, and clothing. Slave hair could be shaved and used for stuffing in pillows and furniture. In some instances, the inner body tissue of slaves (fat, bones, etc) could be made into soap, trophies, and other commodities.

Medical experimentation on slaves was also commonplace. Slaves were routinely used as medical specimens forced to take part in experimental surgeries, amputations, disease research, and developing medical techniques. In many cases, slave cadavers were used in demonstrations and dissection tables.

Slave codes

To help regulate the relationship between slave and owner, including legal support for keeping the slave as property, states established slave codes, most based on laws existing since the colonial era. The code for the District of Columbia defined a slave as "a human being, who is by law deprived of his or her liberty for life, and is the property of another".

While each state had its own slave code, many concepts were shared throughout the slave states. According to the slave codes, some of which were passed in reaction to slave rebellions, teaching a slave to read or write was illegal. This prohibition was unique to American slavery, believed to reduce slaves forming aspirations that could lead to escape or rebellion. Informal education occurred when white children taught slave companions what they were learning; in other cases, adult slaves learned from free artisan workers, especially if located in cities, where there was more freedom of movement.

In Alabama, slaves were not allowed to leave their master's premises without written consent or passes. This was a common requirement in other states as well, and locally run patrols (known to slaves as pater rollers) often checked the passes of slaves who appeared to be away from their plantations. In Alabama slaves were prohibited from trading goods among themselves. In Virginia, a slave was not permitted to drink in public within one mile of his master or during public gatherings. Slaves were not permitted to carry firearms in any of the slave states.

Slaves were generally prohibited by law from associating in groups, with the exception of worship services (a reason why the Black Church is such a notable institution in black communities today). Following Nat Turner's rebellion in 1831, which raised white fears throughout the South, some states also prohibited or restricted religious gatherings of slaves, or required that they be officiated by white men. Planters feared that group meetings would facilitate communication among slaves that could lead to rebellion. Slaves held private, secret "brush meetings" in the woods.

In Ohio, an emancipated slave was prohibited from returning to the state in which he or she had been enslaved. Other Northern states discouraged the settling of free blacks within their boundaries. Fearing the influence of free blacks, Virginia and other Southern states passed laws to require blacks who had been freed to leave the state within a year (or sometimes less time) unless granted a stay by an act of the legislature.

High demand and smuggling

The United States Constitution, adopted in 1787, prevented Congress from completely banning the importation of slaves until 1808, although Congress regulated against the trade in the Slave Trade Act of 1794, and in subsequent Acts in 1800 and 1803. During and after the Revolution, the states individually passed laws against importing slaves. By contrast, the states of Georgia and South Carolina reopened their trade due to demand by their upland planters, who were developing new cotton plantations: Georgia from 1800 until December 31, 1807, and South Carolina from 1804. In that period, Charleston traders imported about 75,000 slaves, more than were brought to South Carolina in the 75 years before the Revolution. Approximately 30,000 were imported to Georgia.

By January 1, 1808, when Congress banned further imports, South Carolina was the only state that still allowed importation of enslaved people. The domestic trade became extremely profitable as demand rose with the expansion of cultivation in the Deep South for cotton and sugar cane crops. Slavery in the United States became, more or less, self-sustaining by natural increase among the current slaves and their descendants. Maryland and Virginia viewed themselves as slave producers, seeing "producing slaves" as resembling animal husbandry. Workers, including many children, were relocated by force from the upper to the lower South.

Despite the ban, slave imports continued through smugglers bringing in slaves past the U.S. Navy's African Slave Trade Patrol to South Carolina, and overland from Texas and Florida, both under Spanish control. Congress increased the punishment associated with importing slaves, classifying it in 1820 as an act of piracy, with smugglers subject to harsh penalties, including death if caught. After that, "it is unlikely that more than 10,000 [slaves] were successfully landed in the United States." But, some smuggling of slaves into the United States continued until just before the start of the Civil War; see slave ships Wanderer and Clotilda.

War of 1812

During the War of 1812, British Royal Navy commanders of the blockading fleet were instructed to offer freedom to defecting American slaves, as the Crown had during the Revolutionary War. Thousands of escaped slaves went over to the Crown with their families. Men were recruited into the Corps of Colonial Marines on occupied Tangier Island, in the Chesapeake Bay. Many freed American slaves were recruited directly into existing West Indian regiments, or newly created British Army units. The British later resettled a few thousand freed slaves to Nova Scotia. Their descendants, together with descendants of the black people resettled there after the Revolution, have established the Black Loyalist Heritage Museum.

Slaveholders, primarily in the South, had considerable "loss of property" as thousands of slaves escaped to the British lines or ships for freedom, despite the difficulties. The planters' complacency about slave "contentment" was shocked by seeing that slaves would risk so much to be free. Afterward, when some freed slaves had been settled at Bermuda, slaveholders such as Major Pierce Butler of South Carolina tried to persuade them to return to the United States, to no avail.

The Americans protested that Britain's failure to return all slaves violated the Treaty of Ghent. After arbitration by the Tsar of Russia, the British paid $1,204,960 in damages (about $ million in today's money) to Washington, which reimbursed the slaveowners.

Religion

Africans brought their religions with them from Africa, including Islam, Catholicism, and traditional religions.

Prior to the American Revolution, masters and revivalists spread Christianity to slave communities, including Catholicism in Spanish Florida and California, and in French and Spanish Louisiana, and Protestantism in English colonies, supported by the Society for the Propagation of the Gospel. In the First Great Awakening of the mid-18th century, Baptists and Methodists from New England preached a message against slavery, encouraged masters to free their slaves, converted both slaves and free blacks, and gave them active roles in new congregations. The first independent black congregations were started in the South before the Revolution, in South Carolina and Georgia. Believing that, "slavery was contrary to the ethics of Jesus", Christian congregations and church clergy, especially in the North, played a role in the Underground Railroad, especially Wesleyan Methodists, Quakers and Congregationalists.

Over the decades and with the growth of slavery throughout the South, some Baptist and Methodist ministers gradually changed their messages to accommodate the institution. After 1830, white Southerners argued for the compatibility of Christianity and slavery, with a multitude of both Old and New Testament citations. They promoted Christianity as encouraging better treatment of slaves and argued for a paternalistic approach. In the 1840s and 1850s, the issue of accepting slavery split the nation's largest religious denominations (the Methodist, Baptist and Presbyterian churches) into separate Northern and Southern organizations; see Methodist Episcopal Church, South, Southern Baptist Convention, and Presbyterian Church in the Confederate States of America). Schisms occurred, such as that between the Wesleyan Methodist Church and the Methodist Episcopal Church.

Southern slaves generally attended their masters' white churches, where they often outnumbered the white congregants. They were usually permitted to sit only in the back or in the balcony. They listened to white preachers, who emphasized the obligation of slaves to keep in their place, and acknowledged the slave's identity as both person and property. Preachers taught the master's responsibility and the concept of appropriate paternal treatment, using Christianity to improve conditions for slaves, and to treat them "justly and fairly" (Col. 4:1). This included masters having self-control, not disciplining under anger, not threatening, and ultimately fostering Christianity among their slaves by example.

Slaves also created their own religious observances, meeting alone without the supervision of their white masters or ministers. The larger plantations with groups of slaves numbering 20, or more, tended to be centers of nighttime meetings of one or several plantation slave populations. These congregations revolved around a singular preacher, often illiterate with limited knowledge of theology, who was marked by his personal piety and ability to foster a spiritual environment. African Americans developed a theology related to Biblical stories having the most meaning for them, including the hope for deliverance from slavery by their own Exodus. One lasting influence of these secret congregations is the African American spiritual.

Slave rebellions

According to Herbert Aptheker, "there were few phases of ante-bellum Southern life and history that were not in some way influenced by the fear of, or the actual outbreak of, militant concerted slave action."

Historians in the 20th century identified 250 to 311 slave uprisings in U.S. and colonial history. Those after 1776 include:
 Gabriel's conspiracy (1800)
 Igbo Landing slave escape and mass suicide (1803)
 Chatham Manor Rebellion (1805)
 1811 German Coast uprising, (1811)
 George Boxley Rebellion (1815)
 Denmark Vesey's conspiracy (1822)
 Nat Turner's slave rebellion (1831)
 Black Seminole Slave Rebellion (1835–1838)
 Amistad seizure (1839)
 Creole case (1841)
 1842 Slave Revolt in the Cherokee Nation

In 1831, Nat Turner, a literate slave who claimed to have spiritual visions, organized a slave rebellion in Southampton County, Virginia; it was sometimes called the Southampton Insurrection. Turner and his followers killed nearly sixty white inhabitants, mostly women and children. Many of the men in the area were attending a religious event in North Carolina. Eventually Turner was captured with 17 other rebels, who were subdued by the militia. Turner and his followers were hanged, and Turner's body was flayed. In a frenzy of fear and retaliation, the militia killed more than 100 slaves who had not been involved in the rebellion. Planters whipped hundreds of innocent slaves to ensure resistance was quelled.

This rebellion prompted Virginia and other slave states to pass more restrictions on slaves and free people of color, controlling their movement and requiring more white supervision of gatherings. In 1835 North Carolina withdrew the franchise for free people of color, and they lost their vote.

Anti-literacy laws

In a feature unique to American slavery, legislatures across the South enacted new laws to curtail the already limited rights of African Americans. For example, Virginia prohibited blacks, free or slave, from practicing preaching, prohibited them from owning firearms, and forbade anyone to teach slaves or free blacks how to read. It specified heavy penalties for both student and teacher if slaves were taught, including whippings or jail.

[E]very assemblage of negroes for the purpose of instruction in reading or writing, or in the night time for any purpose, shall be an unlawful assembly. Any justice may issue his warrant to any office or other person, requiring him to enter any place where such assemblage may be, and seize any negro therein; and he, or any other justice, may order such negro to be punished with stripes.

Unlike in the South, slave owners in Utah were required to send their slaves to school. Black slaves did not have to spend as much time in school as Indian slaves.

Economics

There were approximately 15,000 slaves in New England in 1770 of 650,000 inhabitants. 35,000 slaves lived in the Mid-Atlantic States of 600,000 inhabitants of whom 19,000 lived in New York where they made up 11% of the population. By 1790 Virginia held 44% (315,000 in a total population of 750,000 the State). It was common in agriculture, with a more massive presence in the South, where climate was more propitious for widescale agricultural activity. By 1790 slavery in the New England States was abolished in Massachusetts, New Hampshire, and Vermont and phased out in Rhode Island and Connecticut. New York introduced gradual emancipation in 1799 (completed in 1827). Pennsylvania abolished slavery during the War for Independence.

Robert Fogel and Stanley Engerman, in their 1974 book Time on the Cross, argued that the rate of return of slavery at the market price was close to ten percent, a number close to investment in other assets. The transition from indentured servants to slaves is cited to show that slaves offered greater profits to their owners. A qualified consensus among economic historians and economists is that "Slave agriculture was efficient compared with free agriculture. Economies of scale, effective management, and intensive utilization of labor and capital made southern slave agriculture considerably more efficient than nonslave southern farming", and it is the near-universal consensus among economic historians and economists that slavery was not "a system irrationally kept in existence by plantation owners who failed to perceive or were indifferent to their best economic interests".

The relative price of slaves and indentured servants in the antebellum period did decrease. Indentured servants became more costly with the increase in the demand of skilled labor in England. At the same time, slaves were mostly supplied from within the United States and thus language was not a barrier, and the cost of transporting slaves from one state to another was relatively low. However, as in Brazil and Europe, slavery at its end in the United States tended to be concentrated in the poorest regions of the United States, with a qualified consensus among economists and economic historians concluding that the "modern period of the South's economic convergence to the level of the North only began in earnest when the institutional foundations of the southern regional labor market were undermined, largely by federal farm and labor legislation dating from the 1930s."

In the decades preceding the Civil War, the black population of the United States experienced a rapid natural increase. Unlike the trans-Saharan slave trade with Africa, the slave population transported by the Atlantic slave trade to the United States was sex-balanced. The slave population multiplied nearly fourfold between 1810 and 1860, despite the passage of the Act Prohibiting Importation of Slaves signed into law by President Thomas Jefferson in 1807 banning the international slave trade. Thus, it is also the universal consensus among modern economic historians and economists that slavery in the United States was not "economically moribund on the eve of the Civil War". In the 2010s, several historians, among them Edward E. Baptist, Sven Beckert, Walter Johnson and Calvin Schermerhorn, have posited that slavery was integral in the development of American capitalism. Other economic historians have rejected that thesis.

Efficiency of slaves

Scholars disagree on how to quantify the efficiency of slavery. In Time on the Cross Fogel and Engerman equate efficiency to total factor productivity (TFP), the output per average unit of input on a farm. Using this measurement, Southern farms that enslaved black people using the gang system were 35% more efficient than Northern farms, which used free labor. Under the gang system, groups of slaves perform synchronized tasks under the constant vigilance of an overseer. Each group was like a part of a machine. If perceived to be working below his capacity, a slave could be punished. Fogel argues that this kind of negative enforcement was not frequent and that slaves and free laborers had a similar quality of life; however, there is controversy on this last point. A critique of Fogel and Engerman's view was published by Paul A. David in 1976.

In 1995, a random survey of 178 members of the Economic History Association sought to study the views of economists and economic historians on the debate. The study found that 72 percent of economists and 65 percent of economic historians would generally agree that "Slave agriculture was efficient compared with free agriculture. Economies of scale, effective management, and intensive utilization of labor and capital made southern slave agriculture considerably more efficient than nonslave southern farming." 48 percent of the economists agreed without provisos, while 24 percent agreed when provisos were included in the statement. On the other hand, 58 percent of economic historians and 42 percent of economists disagreed with Fogel and Engerman's "proposition that the material (not psychological) conditions of the lives of slaves compared favorably with those of free industrial workers in the decades before the Civil War".

Prices of slaves
The U.S. has a capitalist economy so the price of slaves was determine by the law of supply and demand. For example, following bans on the import of slaves after the U.K.'s Slave Trade Act 1807 and the American 1807 Act Prohibiting Importation of Slaves, the prices for slaves increased. The markets for the products produced by slaves also affected the price of slaves (e.g. the price of slaves fell when the price of cotton fell in 1840). Anticipation of slavery's abolition also influenced prices. During the Civil War the price for slave men in New Orleans dropped from $1,381 in 1861 to $1,116 by 1862 (the city was captured by U.S. forces in the Spring of 1862).

Controlling for inflation, prices of slaves rose dramatically in the six decades prior to the Civil War, reflecting demand due to commodity cotton, as well as use of slaves in shipping and manufacturing. Although the prices of slaves relative to indentured servants declined, both got more expensive. Cotton production was rising and relied on the use of slaves to yield high profits. Fogel and Engeman initially argued that if the Civil War had not happened, the slave prices would have increased even more, an average of more than fifty percent by 1890.

Prices reflected the characteristics of the slave; such factors as sex, age, nature, and height were all taken into account to determine the price of a slave. Over the life-cycle, the price of enslaved women was higher than their male counterparts up to puberty age, as they would likely bear children who their masters could sell as slaves and could be used as slave laborers. Men around the age of 25 were the most valued, as they were at the highest level of productivity and still had a considerable life-span. If slaves had a history of fights or escapes, their price was lowered reflecting what planters believed was risk of repeating such behavior. Slave traders and buyers would examine a slave's back for whipping scars; a large number of injuries would be seen as evidence of laziness or rebelliousness, rather than the previous master's brutality, and would lower the slave's price. Taller male slaves were priced at a higher level, as height was viewed as a proxy for fitness and productivity.

Effects on Southern economic development

While slavery brought profits in the short run, discussion continues on the economic benefits of slavery in the long run. In 1995, a random anonymous survey of 178 members of the Economic History Association found that out of the forty propositions about American economic history that were surveyed, the group of propositions most disputed by economic historians and economists were those about the postbellum economy of the American South (along with the Great Depression). The only exception was the proposition initially put forward by historian Gavin Wright that the "modern period of the South's economic convergence to the level of the North only began in earnest when the institutional foundations of the southern regional labor market were undermined, largely by federal farm and labor legislation dating from the 1930s." 62 percent of economists (24 percent with and 38 percent without provisos) and 73 percent of historians (23 percent with and 50 percent without provisos) agreed with this statement. Wright has also argued that the private investment of monetary resources in the cotton industry, among others, delayed development in the South of commercial and industrial institutions. There was little public investment in railroads or other infrastructure. Wright argues that agricultural technology was far more developed in the South, representing an economic advantage of the South over the North of the United States.

In Democracy in America, Alexis de Tocqueville noted that "the colonies in which there were no slaves became more populous and more rich than those in which slavery flourished." In 1857, in The Impending Crisis of the South: How to Meet It, Hinton Rowan Helper made the same point. Economists Peter H. Lindert and Jeffrey G. Williamson, in a pair of articles published in 2012 and 2013, found that, despite the American South initially having per capita income roughly double that of the North in 1774, incomes in the South had declined 27% by 1800 and continued to decline over the next four decades, while the economies in New England and the Mid-Atlantic states vastly expanded. By 1840, per capita income in the South was well behind the Northeast and the national average (Note: this is also true in the early 21st century).

Lindert and Williamson argue that this antebellum period is an example of what economists Daron Acemoglu, Simon Johnson, and James A. Robinson call "a reversal of fortune". In his essay "The Real History of Slavery", economist Thomas Sowell reiterated and augmented the observation made by de Tocqueville by comparing slavery in the United States to slavery in Brazil. He notes that slave societies reflected similar economic trends in those and other parts of the world, suggesting that the trend Lindert and Williamson identify may have continued until the American Civil War:

Sowell also notes in Ethnic America: A History, citing historians Clement Eaton and Eugene Genovese, that three-quarters of Southern white families owned no slaves at all. Most slaveholders lived on farms rather than plantations, and few plantations were as large as the fictional ones depicted in Gone with the Wind. In "The Real History of Slavery," Sowell also notes in comparison to slavery in the Arab world and the Middle East (where slaves were seldom used for productive purposes) and China (where the slaves consumed the entire output they created), Sowell observes that many commercial slaveowners in the antebellum South tended to be spendthrift and many lost their plantations due to creditor foreclosures, and in Britain, profits by British slave traders only amounted to two percent of British domestic investment at the height of the Atlantic slave trade in the 18th century. Sowell draws the following conclusion regarding the macroeconomic value of slavery:

In short, even though some individual slaveowners grew rich and some family fortunes were founded on the exploitation of slaves, that is very different from saying that the whole society, or even its non-slave population as a whole, was more economically advanced than it would have been in the absence of slavery. What this means is that, whether employed as domestic servants or producing crops or other goods, millions suffered exploitation and dehumanization for no higher purpose than the... aggrandizement of slaveowners.

Eric Hilt noted that, while some historians have suggested slavery was necessary for the Industrial Revolution (on the grounds that American slave plantations produced most of the raw cotton for the British textiles market and the British textiles market was the vanguard of the Industrial Revolution), it is not clear if this is actually true; there is no evidence that cotton could not have been mass-produced by yeoman farmers rather than slave plantations if the latter had not existed (as their existence tended to force yeoman farmers into subsistence farming) and there is some evidence that they certainly could have. The soil and climate of the American South were excellent for growing cotton, so it is not unreasonable to postulate that farms without slaves could have produced substantial amounts of cotton; even if they did not produce as much as the plantations did, it could still have been enough to serve the demand of British producers. Similar arguments have been made by other historians.

Sexual economy of American slavery 
Scholar Adrienne Davis articulates how the economics of slavery also can be defined as a sexual economy, specifically focusing on how black women were expected to perform physical, sexual and reproductive labor to provide a consistent enslaved workforce and increase the profits of white slavers. Davis writes that black women were needed for their "sexual and reproductive labor to satisfy the economic, political, and personal interest of white men of the elite class" articulating that black women's reproductive capacity was important in the maintenance of the system of slavery due to its ability to perpetuate an enslaved workforce. She is also drawing attention to black women's labor being needed to maintain the aristocracy of a white ruling class, due to the intimate nature of reproduction and its potential for producing more enslaved peoples.

Due to the institution of partus sequitur ventrem, black women's wombs became the site where slavery was developed and transferred, meaning that black women were not only used for their physical labor, but for their sexual and reproductive labor as well.

"The rule that the children's status follows their mothers' was a foundational one for our economy. It converted enslaved women's reproductive capacity into market capital"

This articulation by Davis illustrates how black women's reproductive capacity was commodified under slavery, and that an analysis of the economic structures of slavery requires an acknowledgment of how pivotal black women's sexuality was in maintaining slavery's economic power. Davis writes how black women performed labor under slavery, writing: "[black women were] male when convenient and horrifically female when needed". The fluctuating expectations of black women's gendered labor under slavery disrupted the white normative roles that were assigned to white men and white women. This ungendering black women received under slavery contributed to the systemic dehumanization experienced by enslaved black women, as they were unable to receive the expectations or experiences of either gender within the white binary.

Davis's arguments address the fact that, under slavery, black women's sexuality became linked to the economic and public sphere, making their intimate lives into public institutions. Black women's physical labor was gendered as masculine under slavery when they were needed to yield more profit, but their reproductive capacities and sexual labor was equally as important in maintaining white power over black communities and perpetuating an enslaved workforce. This blurring of the line between the private and public sphere is another way Davis articulates how black women's sexuality and reproduction was commodified and exploited for capitalist gain, as their private and intimate lives became disrupted by the violence at the hands of white men, and their sexual capacities became an important part of the public marketplace and United States economy.

Despite this, the slave population transported by the Atlantic slave trade to the United States was sex-balanced and most survived the passage. Despite lacking legal recognition, most slaves in the antebellum South lived in families, unlike the trans-Saharan slave trade with Africa, which was overwhelmingly female and in which the majority died en route crossing the Sahara (with the large majority of the minority of male African slaves dying as a result of crude castration procedures to produce eunuchs, who were in demand as harem attendants).

1850s

In 1850, Congress passed the Fugitive Slave Act, as part of the Compromise of 1850, which required law enforcement and citizens of free states to cooperate in the capture and return of slaves. This met with considerable overt and covert resistance in free states and cities such as Philadelphia, New York, and Boston. Refugees from slavery continued to flee the South across the Ohio River and other parts of the Mason–Dixon line dividing North from South, to the North and Canada via the Underground Railroad. Some white Northerners helped hide former slaves from their former owners or helped them reach freedom in Canada.

As part of the Compromise of 1850, Congress abolished the slave trade (though not the ownership of slaves) in the District of Columbia; fearing this would happen, Alexandria, regional slave trading center and port, successfully sought its removal from the District of Columbia and devolution to Virginia. After 1854, Republicans argued that the "Slave Power", especially the pro-slavery Democratic Party in the South, controlled two of the three branches of the Federal government.

The abolitionists, realizing that the total elimination of slavery was unrealistic as an immediate goal, worked to prevent the expansion of slavery into the western territories which eventually would be new states. The Missouri Compromise, the Compromise of 1850, and the Bleeding Kansas period dealt with whether new states would be slave or free, or how that was to be decided. Both sides were anxious about effects of these decisions on the balance of power in the Senate.

After the passage of the Kansas–Nebraska Act in 1854, border fighting broke out in the Kansas Territory, where the question of whether it would be admitted to the Union as a slave or free state was left to the inhabitants. Migrants from both free and slave states moved into the territory to prepare for the vote on slavery. Abolitionist John Brown, the most famous of the anti-slavery immigrants, was active in the fighting in "Bleeding Kansas," but so too were many white Southerners (many from adjacent Missouri) who opposed abolition.

Abraham Lincoln's and the Republicans' political platform in 1860 was to stop slavery's expansion. Historian James M. McPherson says that in his famous "House Divided" speech in 1858, Lincoln said American republicanism can be purified by restricting the further expansion of slavery as the first step to putting it on the road to 'ultimate extinction.' Southerners took Lincoln at his word. When he won the presidency, they left the Union to escape the 'ultimate extinction' of slavery."

Freedom suits and Dred Scott

With the development of slave and free states after the American Revolution, and far-flung commercial and military activities, new situations arose in which slaves might be taken by masters into free states. Most free states not only prohibited slavery, but ruled that slaves brought and kept there illegally could be freed. Such cases were sometimes known as transit cases. Dred Scott and his wife Harriet Scott each sued for freedom in St. Louis after the death of their master, based on their having been held in a free territory (the northern part of the Louisiana Purchase from which slavery was excluded under the terms of the Missouri Compromise). (Later the two cases were combined under Dred Scott's name.) Scott filed suit for freedom in 1846 and went through two state trials, the first denying and the second granting freedom to the couple (and, by extension, their two daughters, who had also been held illegally in free territories). For 28 years, Missouri state precedent had generally respected laws of neighboring free states and territories, ruling for freedom in such transit cases where slaves had been held illegally in free territory. But in the Dred Scott case, the Missouri Supreme Court ruled against the slaves.

After Scott and his team appealed the case to the U.S. Supreme Court, Chief Justice Roger B. Taney, in a sweeping decision, denied Scott his freedom. The 1857 decision, decided 7–2, held that a slave did not become free when taken into a free state; Congress could not bar slavery from a territory; and people of African descent imported into the United States and held as slaves, or their descendants, could never be citizens and thus had no status to bring suit in a U.S. court. A state could not bar slaveowners from bringing slaves into that state. Many Republicans, including Abraham Lincoln, considered the decision unjust and evidence that the Slave Power had seized control of the Supreme Court. Anti-slavery groups were enraged and slave owners encouraged, escalating the tensions that led to civil war.

Civil War and emancipation

1860 presidential election

The divisions became fully exposed with the 1860 presidential election. The electorate split four ways. The Southern Democrats endorsed slavery, while the Republican Party denounced it. The Northern Democrats said democracy required the people to decide on slavery locally, state by state and territory by territory. The Constitutional Union Party said the survival of the Union was at stake and everything else should be compromised.

Lincoln, the Republican, won with a plurality of popular votes and a majority of electoral votes. Lincoln, however, did not appear on the ballots of ten southern slave states. Many slave owners in the South feared that the real intent of the Republicans was the abolition of slavery in states where it already existed, and that the sudden emancipation of four million slaves would be disastrous for the slave owners and for the economy that drew its greatest profits from the labor of people who were not paid. The slave owners feared that ending the balance could lead to the domination of the federal government by the northern free states. This led seven southern states to secede from the Union. When the Confederate Army attacked a U.S. Army installation at Fort Sumter, the American Civil War began and four additional slave states seceded. Northern leaders had viewed the slavery interests as a threat politically, but with secession, they viewed the prospect of a new Southern nation, the Confederate States of America, with control over the Mississippi River and parts of the West, as politically unacceptable. Most of all, they could not accept this repudiation of American nationalism.

Civil War

The consequent American Civil War, beginning in 1861, led to the end of chattel slavery in America. Not long after the war broke out, through a legal maneuver by Union General Benjamin F. Butler, a lawyer by profession, slaves who fled to Union lines were considered "contraband of war". General Butler ruled that they were not subject to return to Confederate owners as they had been before the war. "Lincoln and his Cabinet discussed the issue on May 30 and decided to support Butler's stance". Soon word spread, and many slaves sought refuge in Union territory, desiring to be declared "contraband". Many of the "contrabands" joined the Union Army as workers or troops, forming entire regiments of the U.S. Colored Troops. Others went to refugee camps such as the Grand Contraband Camp near Fort Monroe or fled to northern cities. General Butler's interpretation was reinforced when Congress passed the Confiscation Act of 1861, which declared that any property used by the Confederate military, including slaves, could be confiscated by Union forces.

At the beginning of the war, some Union commanders thought they were supposed to return escaped slaves to their masters. By 1862, when it became clear that this would be a long war, the question of what to do about slavery became more general. The Southern economy and military effort depended on slave labor. It began to seem unreasonable to protect slavery while blockading Southern commerce and destroying Southern production. As Congressman George W. Julian of Indiana put it in an 1862 speech in Congress, the slaves "cannot be neutral. As laborers, if not as soldiers, they will be allies of the rebels, or of the Union." Julian and his fellow Radical Republicans put pressure on Lincoln to rapidly emancipate the slaves, whereas moderate Republicans came to accept gradual, compensated emancipation and colonization. Copperheads, the border states and War Democrats opposed emancipation, although the border states and War Democrats eventually accepted it as part of total war needed to save the Union.

Emancipation Proclamation

The Emancipation Proclamation was an executive order issued by President Abraham Lincoln on January 1, 1863. In a single stroke it changed the legal status, as recognized by the U.S. government, of three million slaves in designated areas of the Confederacy from "slave" to "free". It had the practical effect that as soon as a slave escaped the control of the Confederate government, by running away or through advances of federal troops, the slave became legally and actually free. Plantation owners, realizing that emancipation would destroy their economic system, sometimes moved their slaves as far as possible out of reach of the Union army. By June 1865, the Union Army controlled all of the Confederacy and had liberated all of the designated slaves.

In 1861, Lincoln expressed the fear that premature attempts at emancipation would mean the loss of the border states. He believed that "to lose Kentucky is nearly the same as to lose the whole game." At first, Lincoln reversed attempts at emancipation by Secretary of War Simon Cameron and Generals John C. Fremont (in Missouri) and David Hunter (in South Carolina, Georgia and Florida) to keep the loyalty of the border states and the War Democrats.

Lincoln mentioned his Emancipation Proclamation to members of his cabinet on July 21, 1862. Secretary of State William H. Seward advised Lincoln to wait for a victory before issuing the proclamation, as to do otherwise would seem like "our last shriek on the retreat". In September 1862 the Battle of Antietam provided this opportunity, and the subsequent War Governors' Conference added support for the proclamation.

On September 22, 1862, Lincoln issued his preliminary Emancipation Proclamation, which provided that enslaved people in the states in rebellion against the United States on January 1, 1863, "shall be then, thenceforward, and forever free." Lincoln issued his final Emancipation Proclamation on January 1, 1863. In his letter to Hodges, Lincoln explained his belief that

Lincoln's Emancipation Proclamation of January 1, 1863 was a powerful action that promised freedom for slaves in the Confederacy as soon as the Union armies reached them, and authorized the enlistment of African Americans in the Union Army. The Emancipation Proclamation did not free slaves in the Union-allied slaveholding states that bordered the Confederacy. Since the Confederate States did not recognize the authority of President Lincoln, and the proclamation did not apply in the border states, at first the proclamation freed only those slaves who had escaped behind Union lines. The proclamation made the abolition of slavery an official war goal that was implemented as the Union took territory from the Confederacy. According to the Census of 1860, this policy would free nearly four million slaves, or over 12% of the total population of the United States.

Based on the President's war powers, the Emancipation Proclamation applied to territory held by Confederates at the time. However, the Proclamation became a symbol of the Union's growing commitment to add emancipation to the Union's definition of liberty. Lincoln played a leading role in getting the constitutionally required two-thirds majority of both houses of Congress to vote for the Thirteenth Amendment, which made emancipation universal and permanent.

Enslaved African Americans had not waited for Lincoln before escaping and seeking freedom behind Union lines. From the early years of the war, hundreds of thousands of African Americans escaped to Union lines, especially in Union-controlled areas such as Norfolk and the Hampton Roads region in 1862 Virginia, Tennessee from 1862 on, the line of Sherman's march, etc. So many African Americans fled to Union lines that commanders created camps and schools for them, where both adults and children learned to read and write. The American Missionary Association entered the war effort by sending teachers south to such contraband camps, for instance, establishing schools in Norfolk and on nearby plantations.

In addition, nearly 200,000 African-American men served with distinction in the Union forces as soldiers and sailors; most were escaped slaves. The Confederacy was outraged by armed black soldiers and refused to treat them as prisoners of war. They murdered many, as at the Fort Pillow massacre, and re-enslaved others.

On February 24, 1863, the Arizona Organic Act abolished slavery in the newly formed Arizona Territory. Tennessee and all of the border states (except Kentucky and Delaware) abolished slavery by early 1865. Thousands of slaves were freed by the operation of the Emancipation Proclamation as Union armies marched across the South. Emancipation came to the remaining Southern slaves after the surrender of all Confederate troops in spring 1865.

In spite of the South's shortage of manpower, until 1865, most Southern leaders opposed arming slaves as soldiers. However, a few Confederates discussed arming slaves. Finally, in early 1865, General Robert E. Lee said that black soldiers were essential, and legislation was passed. The first black units were in training when the war ended in April.

End of slavery

Booker T. Washington remembered Emancipation Day in early 1863, when he was a boy of9 in Virginia:

The war ended on June 22, 1865, and following that surrender, the Emancipation Proclamation was enforced throughout remaining regions of the South that had not yet freed the slaves. Slavery officially continued for a couple of months in other locations. Federal troops arrived in Galveston, Texas, on June 19, 1865, to enforce the emancipation. The commemoration of that event, Juneteenth National Independence Day, has been declared a national holiday in 2021.

The Thirteenth Amendment, abolishing slavery except as punishment for a crime, had been passed by the Senate in April 1864, and by the House of Representatives in January 1865.
The amendment did not take effect until it was ratified by three-fourths of the states, which occurred on December 6, 1865, when Georgia ratified it. On that date, the last 40,000–45,000 enslaved Americans in the remaining two slave states of Kentucky and Delaware, as well as the 200 or so perpetual apprentices in New Jersey left from the very gradual emancipation process begun in 1804, were freed.

Cost comparisons
The American historian R. R. Palmer opined that the abolition of slavery in the United States without compensation to the former slave owners was an "annihilation of individual property rights without parallel...in the history of the Western world". Economic historian Robert E. Wright argues that it would have been much cheaper, with minimal deaths, if the federal government had purchased and freed all the slaves, rather than fighting the Civil War. Another economic historian, Roger Ransom, writes that Gerald Gunderson compared compensated emancipation to the cost of the war and "notes that the two are roughly the same order of magnitude2.5 to 3.7 billion dollars". Ransom also writes that compensated emancipation would have tripled federal outlays if paid over the period of 25 years and was a program that had no political support within the United States during the 1860s.

Reconstruction to the present

Journalist Douglas A. Blackmon reported in his Pulitzer Prize-winning book Slavery By Another Name that many black persons were virtually enslaved under convict leasing programs, which started after the Civil War. Most Southern states had no prisons; they leased convicts to businesses and farms for their labor, and the lessee paid for food and board. The incentives for abuse were satisfied.

The continued involuntary servitude took various forms, but the primary forms included convict leasing, peonage, and sharecropping, with the latter eventually encompassing Poor Whites as well. By the 1930s, whites constituted most of the sharecroppers in the South. Mechanization of agriculture had reduced the need for farm labor, and many black people left the South in the Great Migration. Jurisdictions and states created fines and sentences for a wide variety of minor crimes and used these as an excuse to arrest and sentence black people. Under convict leasing programs, African American men, often guilty of no crime at all, were arrested, compelled to work without pay, repeatedly bought and sold, and coerced to do the bidding of the leaseholder. Sharecropping, as it was practiced during this period, often involved severe restrictions on the freedom of movement of sharecroppers, who could be whipped for leaving the plantation. Both sharecropping and convict leasing were legal and tolerated by both the North and South. However, peonage was an illicit form of forced labor. Its existence was ignored by authorities while thousands of African Americans and poor Anglo-Americans were subjugated and held in bondage until the mid-1960s to the late 1970s. With the exception of cases of peonage, beyond the period of Reconstruction, the federal government took almost no action to enforce the 13th Amendment until December 1941 when President Franklin Delano Roosevelt summoned his attorney general. Five days after the attack on Pearl Harbor, at the request of the President, Attorney General Francis Biddle issued Circular No. 3591 to all federal prosecutors, instructing them to actively investigate and try any case of involuntary servitude or slavery. Several months later, convict leasing was officially abolished. But aspects have persisted in other forms. Historians argue that other systems of penal labor were all created in 1865, and convict leasing was simply the most oppressive form. Over time a large civil rights movement arose to bring full civil rights and equality under the law to all Americans.

Convict leasing

With emancipation a legal reality, white Southerners were concerned with both controlling the newly freed slaves and keeping them in the labor force at the lowest level. The system of convict leasing began during Reconstruction and was fully implemented in the 1880s and officially ending in the last state, Alabama, in 1928. It persisted in various forms until it was abolished in 1942 by President Franklin D. Roosevelt during World War II, several months after the attack on Pearl Harbor involved the U.S. in the conflict. This system allowed private contractors to purchase the services of convicts from the state or local governments for a specific time period. African Americans, due to "vigorous and selective enforcement of laws and discriminatory sentencing," made up the vast majority of the convicts leased. Writer Douglas A. Blackmon writes of the system:

The constitutional basis for convict leasing is that the Thirteenth Amendment, while abolishing slavery and involuntary servitude generally, expressly permits it as a punishment for crime.

Educational issues

The anti-literacy laws after 1832 contributed greatly to the problem of widespread illiteracy facing the freedmen and other African Americans after Emancipation and the Civil War 35 years later. The problem of illiteracy and need for education was seen as one of the greatest challenges confronting these people as they sought to join the free enterprise system and support themselves during Reconstruction and thereafter.

Consequently, many black and white religious organizations, former Union Army officers and soldiers, and wealthy philanthropists were inspired to create and fund educational efforts specifically for the betterment of African Americans; some African Americans had started their own schools before the end of the war. Northerners helped create numerous normal schools, such as those that became Hampton University and Tuskegee University, to generate teachers, as well as other colleges for former slaves. Blacks held teaching as a high calling, with education the first priority for children and adults. Many of the most talented went into the field. Some of the schools took years to reach a high standard, but they managed to get thousands of teachers started. As W. E. B. Du Bois noted, the black colleges were not perfect, but "in a single generation they put thirty thousand black teachers in the South" and "wiped out the illiteracy of the majority of black people in the land".

Northern philanthropists continued to support black education in the 20th century, even as tensions rose within the black community, exemplified by Booker T. Washington and W. E. B. Du Bois, as to the proper emphasis between industrial and classical academic education at the college level. An example of a major donor to Hampton Institute and Tuskegee was George Eastman, who also helped fund health programs at colleges and in communities. Collaborating with Washington in the early decades of the 20th century, philanthropist Julius Rosenwald provided matching funds for community efforts to build rural schools for black children. He insisted on white and black cooperation in the effort, wanting to ensure that white-controlled school boards made a commitment to maintain the schools. By the 1930s local parents had helped raise funds (sometimes donating labor and land) to create over 5,000 rural schools in the South. Other philanthropists, such as Henry H. Rogers and Andrew Carnegie, each of whom had arisen from modest roots to become wealthy, used matching fund grants to stimulate local development of libraries and schools.

Apologies
On February 24, 2007, the Virginia General Assembly passed House Joint Resolution Number 728 acknowledging "with profound regret the involuntary servitude of Africans and the exploitation of Native Americans, and call for reconciliation among all Virginians". With the passing of this resolution, Virginia became the first state to acknowledge through the state's governing body their state's negative involvement in slavery. The passing of this resolution was in anticipation of the 400th anniversary commemoration of the founding of Jamestown, Virginia (the first permanent English settlement in North America), which was an early colonial slave port. Apologies have also been issued by Alabama, Florida, Maryland, North Carolina and New Jersey.

On July 29, 2008, during the 110th United States Congress session, the United States House of Representatives passed a resolution 'HR. 194' apologizing for American slavery and subsequent discriminatory laws.

The U.S. Senate unanimously passed a similar resolution on June 18, 2009, apologizing for the "fundamental injustice, cruelty, brutality, and inhumanity of slavery". It also explicitly states that it cannot be used for restitution claims.

Political legacy
A 2016 study, published in The Journal of Politics, finds that "[w]hites who currently live in Southern counties that had high shares of slaves in 1860 are more likely to identify as a Republican, oppose affirmative action, and express racial resentment and colder feelings toward blacks." The study contends that "contemporary differences in political attitudes across counties in the American South in part trace their origins to slavery's prevalence more than 150 years ago. " The authors argue that their findings are consistent with the theory that "following the Civil War, Southern whites faced political and economic incentives to reinforce existing racist norms and institutions to maintain control over the newly freed African American population. This amplified local differences in racially conservative political attitudes, which in turn have been passed down locally across generations."

A 2017 study in the British Journal of Political Science argued that the British American colonies without slavery adopted better democratic institutions to attract migrant workers to their colonies.

Native Americans

Native Americans as slaves

During the 17th and 18th centuries, Native American slavery, the enslavement of Native Americans by European colonists, was common. Many of these Native slaves were exported to the Northern colonies and to off-shore colonies, especially the "sugar islands" of the Caribbean. The exact number of Native Americans who were enslaved is unknown because vital statistics and census reports were at best infrequent. Historian Alan Gallay estimates that from 1670 to 1715, British slave traders sold between 24,000 and 51,000 Native Americans from what is now the southern part of the U.S. Andrés Reséndez estimates that between 147,000 and 340,000 Native Americans were enslaved in North America, excluding Mexico. Even after the Indian Slave Trade ended in 1750 the enslavement of Native Americans continued in the west, and also in the Southern states mostly through kidnappings.

Slavery of Native Americans was organized in colonial and Mexican California through Franciscan missions, theoretically entitled to ten years of Native labor, but in practice maintaining them in perpetual servitude, until their charge was revoked in the mid-1830s. Following the 1847–48 invasion by U.S. troops, the "loitering or orphaned Indians" were de facto enslaved in the new state from statehood in 1850 to 1867. Slavery required the posting of a bond by the slave holder and enslavement occurred through raids and a four-month servitude imposed as a punishment for Indian "vagrancy".

Native Americans holding African-American slaves

After 1800, some of the Cherokee and the other four civilized tribes of the Southeast started buying and using black slaves as labor. They continued this practice after removal to Indian Territory in the 1830s, when as many as 15,000 enslaved blacks were taken with them.

The nature of slavery in Cherokee society often mirrored that of white slave-owning society. The law barred intermarriage of Cherokees and enslaved African Americans, but Cherokee men had unions with enslaved women, resulting in mixed-race children. Cherokee who aided slaves were punished with one hundred lashes on the back. In Cherokee society, persons of African descent were barred from holding office even if they were also racially and culturally Cherokee. They were also barred from bearing arms and owning property. The Cherokee prohibited the teaching of African Americans to read and write.

By contrast, the Seminole welcomed into their nation African Americans who had escaped slavery (Black Seminoles). Historically, the Black Seminoles lived mostly in distinct bands near the Native American Seminole. Some were held as slaves of particular Seminole leaders. Seminole practice in Florida had acknowledged slavery, though not the chattel slavery model common elsewhere. It was, in fact, more like feudal dependency and taxation. The relationship between Seminole blacks and natives changed following their relocation in the 1830s to territory controlled by the Creek who had a system of chattel slavery. Pro slavery pressure from Creek and pro-Creek Seminole and slave raiding led to many Black Seminoles escaping to Mexico.

Inter-tribal slavery
The Haida and Tlingit Indians who lived along the southeastern Alaskan coast were traditionally known as fierce warriors and slave-traders, raiding as far as California. Slavery was hereditary after slaves were taken as prisoners of war. Among some Pacific Northwest tribes, about a quarter of the population were slaves. Other slave-owning tribes of North America were, for example, Comanche of Texas, Creek of Georgia, the fishing societies, such as the Yurok, that lived along the coast from what is now Alaska to California; the Pawnee, and Klamath.

Some tribes held people as captive slaves late in the 19th century. For instance, "Ute Woman", was a Ute captured by the Arapaho and later sold to a Cheyenne. She was kept by the Cheyenne to be used as a prostitute to serve American soldiers at Cantonment in the Indian Territory. She lived in slavery until about 1880. She died of a hemorrhage resulting from "excessive sexual intercourse".

Black slave owners
Slave owners included a comparatively small number of people of at least partial African ancestry, in each of the original thirteen colonies and later states and territories that allowed slavery; in some early cases black Americans also had white indentured servants. An African former indentured servant who settled in Virginia in 1621, Anthony Johnson, became one of the earliest documented slave owners in the mainland American colonies when he won a civil suit for ownership of John Casor. In 1830, there were 3,775 black (including mixed-race) slaveholders in the South who owned a total of 12,760 slaves, which was a small percentage of a total of over two million slaves then held in the South. 80% of the black slaveholders were located in Louisiana, South Carolina, Virginia and Maryland.

There were economic and ethnic differences between free blacks of the Upper South and the Deep South, with the latter fewer in number, but wealthier and typically of mixed race. Half of the black slaveholders lived in cities rather than the countryside, with most living in New Orleans and Charleston. In particular, New Orleans had a large, relatively wealthy free black population (gens de couleur) composed of people of mixed race, who had become a third social class between whites and enslaved blacks, under French and Spanish colonial rule. Relatively few non-white slaveholders were substantial planters; of those who were, most were of mixed race, often endowed by white fathers with some property and social capital. For example, Andrew Durnford of New Orleans was listed as owning 77 slaves. According to Rachel Kranz: "Durnford was known as a stern master who worked his slaves hard and punished them often in his efforts to make his Louisiana sugar plantation a success." In the years leading up to the Civil War, Antoine Dubuclet, who owned over a hundred slaves, was considered the wealthiest black slaveholder in Louisiana.

The historians John Hope Franklin and Loren Schweninger wrote:

The historian Ira Berlin wrote:

African-American history and culture scholar Henry Louis Gates Jr. wrote:

Free blacks were perceived "as a continual symbolic threat to slaveholders, challenging the idea that 'black' and 'slave' were synonymous". Free blacks were sometimes seen as potential allies of fugitive slaves and "slaveholders bore witness to their fear and loathing of free blacks in no uncertain terms." For free blacks, who had only a precarious hold on freedom, "slave ownership was not simply an economic convenience but indispensable evidence of the free blacks' determination to break with their slave past and their silent acceptanceif not approvalof slavery."

The historian James Oakes, in 1982, stated that:

In his 1985 statewide study of black slaveholders in South Carolina, Larry Koger challenged this benevolent view. He found that the majority of mixed-race or black slaveholders appeared to hold at least some of their slaves for commercial reasons. For instance, he noted that in 1850 more than 80% of black slaveholders were of mixed race, but nearly 90% of their slaves were classified as black. Koger also noted that many South Carolina free blacks operated small businesses as skilled artisans, and many owned slaves working in those businesses. "Koger emphasizes that it was all too common for freed slaves to become slaveholders themselves."

Some free black slaveholders in New Orleans offered to fight for Louisiana in the Civil War. Over 1,000 free black people volunteered and formed the 1st Louisiana Native Guard, which was disbanded without ever seeing combat.

Distribution

Distribution of slaves

For various reasons, the census did not always include all of the slaves, especially in the West. California was admitted as a free state and reported no slaves. However, there were many slaves that were brought to work in the mines during the California Gold Rush. Some Californian communities openly tolerated slavery, such as San Bernardino, which was mostly made up of transplants from the neighboring slave territory of Utah. New Mexico Territory never reported any slaves on the census, yet sued the government for compensation for 600 slaves that were freed when Congress outlawed slavery in the territory. Utah was actively trying to hide its slave population from Congress and did not report slaves in several communities. Additionally, the census did not traditionally include Native Americans, and hence did not include Native American slaves or Native African slaves owned by Native Americans. There were hundreds of Native American slaves in California,<ref>Castillo, E.D. 1998. "Short Overview of California Indian History" , California Native American Heritage Commission, 1998. Retrieved October 24, 2007.</ref> Utah and New Mexico that were never recorded in the census.

Distribution of slaveholders
As of the 1860 Census, one may compute the following statistics on slaveholding:
 Enumerating slave schedules by county, 393,975 named persons held 3,950,546 unnamed slaves, for an average of about ten slaves per holder. As some large holders held slaves in multiple counties and are thus multiply counted, this slightly overestimates the number of slaveholders.
 Excluding slaves, the 1860 U.S. population was 27,167,529; therefore, approximately 1.45% of free persons (roughly one in 69) was a named slaveholder (393,975 named slaveholders among 27,167,529 free persons). By counting only named slaveholders, this approach does not acknowledge people who benefited from slavery by being in a slaveowning household, e.g., the wife and children of an owner; in 1850, there was an average of 5.55 people per household, so on average, around 8.05% of free persons lived in a slave-owning household. In the South, 33% of families owned at least one slave. According to historian Joseph Glatthaar, the number of soldiers of the Confederacy's Army of Northern Virginia who either owned slaves or came from slave owning households is "almost one of every two 1861 recruits". In addition he notes that, "Untold numbers of enlistees rented land from, sold crops to, or worked for slaveholders. In the final tabulation, the vast majority of the volunteers of 1861 had a direct connection to slavery."
 It is estimated by the transcriber Tom Blake, that holders of 200 or more slaves, constituting less than 1% of all U.S. slaveholders (fewer than 4,000 persons, one in 7,000 free persons, or 0.015% of the population) held an estimated 20–30% of all slaves (800,000 to 1,200,000 slaves). Nineteen holders of 500 or more slaves have been identified. The largest slaveholder was Joshua John Ward, of Georgetown, South Carolina, who in 1850 held 1,092 slaves, and whose heirs in 1860 held 1,130 or 1,131 slaveshe was dubbed "the king of the rice planters", and one of his plantations is now part of Brookgreen Gardens.
 The percentage of families that owned slaves in 1860 in various groupings of states was as follows:

Historiography

The historian Peter Kolchin, writing in 1993, noted that until the latter decades of the 20th century, historians of slavery had primarily concerned themselves with the culture, practices and economics of the slaveholders, not with the slaves. This was in part due to the circumstance that most slaveholders were literate and left behind written records, whereas slaves were largely illiterate and not in a position to leave written records. Scholars differed as to whether slavery should be considered a benign or a "harshly exploitive" institution.

Much of the history written prior to the 1950s had a distinctive racist slant to it. By the 1970s and 1980s, historians were using archaeological records, black folklore and statistical data to develop a much more detailed and nuanced picture of slave life. Individuals were shown to have been resilient and somewhat autonomous in many of their activities, within the limits of their situation and despite its precariousness. Historians who wrote in this era include John Blassingame (Slave Community), Eugene Genovese (Roll, Jordan, Roll), Leslie Howard Owens (This Species of Property), and Herbert Gutman (The Black Family in Slavery and Freedom).

See also

 Abolition of slavery timeline
 African American founding fathers of the United States
 American Descendants of Slavery (ADOS)
 American slave court cases
 The Bible and slavery
 Education during the slave period
 Fugitive slaves in the United States
 Historiography of slavery in the U.S.
 Human trafficking in the United States
 List of notable opponents of slavery
 Old Slave Mart, museum in Charleston, S.C.
 Origins of the American Civil War
 Reparations for slavery debate in the United States
 Reverse Underground Railroad
 Slave health on plantations in the United States
 Slave narrative
 Slavery among Native Americans in the United States
 Slavery at American colleges and universities
 Trail of Tears
 Triangular trade

Histories of slavery in the Western Hemisphere
 Slavery in the Spanish New World colonies
 Slavery in the British and French Caribbean
 Slavery in Cuba
 Slavery in Brazil
 Slavery in Latin America

Histories of slavery in individual states and territories

 Alabama
 Arkansas
 Alaska
 California
 Connecticut
 Delaware
 District of Columbia
 Florida
 Georgia
 Illinois
 Indiana
 Kansas
 Kentucky
 Louisiana
 Maryland
 Massachusetts
 Missouri
 Mississippi
 Nebraska
 New Hampshire
 New Jersey
 New Mexico
 New York
 North Carolina
 Ohio
 Pennsylvania
 Rhode Island
 Tennessee
 Texas
 South Carolina
 Utah
 Vermont
 Virginia
 West Virginia

Notes

References

Bibliography
National and comparative studies

 Berlin, Ira. Generations of Captivity: A History of African American Slaves, 2003, .
 Berlin, Ira. Many Thousands Gone: The First Two Centuries of Slavery in North America, Harvard University Press, 1998, . Preview.
 Berlin, Ira and Ronald Hoffman, eds. Slavery and Freedom in the Age of the American Revolution, University Press of Virginia, 1983. Preview.
 Blackmon, Douglas A. Slavery by Another Name: The Re-Enslavement of Black Americans from the Civil War to World War II, 2008, . Preview.
 Blassingame, John W. The Slave Community: Plantation Life in the Antebellum South Oxford University Press, 1979, . Preview.
 David, Paul A. and Temin, Peter. "Review: Slavery: The Progressive Institution?", Journal of Economic History. Vol. 34, No.3 (September 1974)
 Davis, David Brion. Inhuman Bondage: The Rise and Fall of Slavery in the New World, 2006.
  Preview.
 Elkins, Stanley. Slavery: A Problem in American Institutional and Intellectual Life. University of Chicago Press, 1976, . Preview.
 Fehrenbacher, Don E. Slavery, Law, and Politics: The Dred Scott Case in Historical Perspective, Oxford University Press, 1981. Preview.
 Fogel, Robert W. Without Consent or Contract: The Rise and Fall of American Slavery, W.W. Norton, 1989. Preview.
  Preview.
 Foner, Eric. The Fiery Trial: Abraham Lincoln and American Slavery, 2010, Pulitzer Prize. Preview.
 Franklin, John Hope and Loren Schweninger. Runaway Slaves: Rebels on the Plantation, 1999, . Preview.
 Gallay, Alan. The Indian Slave Trade, 2002. Preview.
 Genovese, Eugene D. Roll, Jordan, Roll: The World the Slaves Made, Pantheon Books, 1974. Preview.
 Genovese, Eugene D. The Political Economy of Slavery: Studies in the Economy and Society of the Slave South, 1967. Preview.
 Genovese, Eugene D. and Elizabeth Fox-Genovese, Fruits of Merchant Capital: Slavery and Bourgeois Property in the Rise and Expansion of Capitalism, 1983. Preview.
 Hahn, Steven. The Greatest Slave Rebellion in Modern History: Southern Slaves in the American Civil War, Southern Spaces, 2004.
 Higginbotham, A. Leon, Jr. In the Matter of Color: Race and the American Legal Process: The Colonial Period. Oxford University Press, 1978, . Preview.
 Horton, James Oliver and Horton, Lois E. Slavery and the Making of America, 2005, . Preview.
 Kolchin, Peter. American Slavery, 1619–1877, Hill and Wang, 1993.
 Litwack, Leon F. Been in the Storm So Long: The Aftermath of Slavery (1979), social history of how slavery ended in the Confederacy. Preview.
  Preview.
 Mason, Matthew. Slavery and Politics in the Early American Republic, 2006, . Preview.
 Moon, Dannell, "Slavery", article in Encyclopedia of Rape, Merril D. Smith (Ed.), Greenwood Publishing Group, 2004. 
 Moore, Wilbert Ellis, American Negro Slavery and Abolition: A Sociological Study, Ayer Publishing, 1980. Preview.
 Morgan, Edmund S. American Slavery, American Freedom: The Ordeal of Colonial Virginia , W.W. Norton, 1975. Preview.
 Morris, Thomas D. Southern Slavery and the Law, 1619–1860, University of North Carolina Press, 1996. Preview.
 Oakes, James. The Ruling Race: A History of American Slaveholders, 1982, . Preview.
 Ransom, Roger L. "Was It Really All That Great to Be a Slave?" Agricultural History, Vol. 48, No.4, 1974. Preview.
 Rodriguez, Junius P., ed. Encyclopedia of Emancipation and Abolition in the Transatlantic World, Armonk, NY: M.E. Sharpe, 2007.
 Rodriguez, Junius P., ed. Encyclopedia of Slave Resistance and Rebellion, Greenwood Publishing Group, 2007.
 Scarborough, William K. The Overseer: Plantation Management in the Old South, 1984. Preview.
 Schermerhorn, Calvin. The Business of Slavery and the Rise of American Capitalism, 1815–1860, Yale University Press, 2015.
 Snyder, Terri L. The Power to Die: Slavery and Suicide in British North America, University of Chicago Press, 2015.
 Stampp, Kenneth M. The Peculiar Institution: Slavery in the Ante-Bellum South, 1956. Preview.
 Stampp, Kenneth M. "Interpreting the Slaveholders' World: a Review." Agricultural History 1970 44(4): 407–412, . Preview.
 Tadman, Michael. Speculators and Slaves: Masters, Traders, and Slaves in the Old South, University of Wisconsin Press, 1989. Preview.
 United States Census Bureau. Negro Population in the United States, 1790-1915, New York: Arno Press, 1968.  Preview
 Wright, W. D. Historians and Slavery; A Critical Analysis of Perspectives and Irony in American Slavery and Other Recent Works, Washington, D.C.: University Press of America, 1978.

State and local studies

  Preview.
 Fields, Barbara J. Slavery and Freedom on the Middle Ground: Maryland During the Nineteenth Century, Yale University Press, 1985.
 Jewett, Clayton E. and John O. Allen; Slavery in the South: A State-By-State History Greenwood Press, 2004. Preview.
 Jennison, Watson W. Cultivating Race: The Expansion of Slavery in Georgia, 1750–1860, University Press of Kentucky, 2012. Preview.
 Kulikoff, Alan. Tobacco and Slaves: The Development of Southern Cultures in the Chesapeake, 1680–1800 University of North Carolina Press, 1986. Preview.
 Minges, Patrick N.; Slavery in the Cherokee Nation: The Keetoowah Society and the Defining of a People, 1855–1867, 2003. Preview.
 Mohr, Clarence L. On the Threshold of Freedom: Masters and Slaves in Civil War Georgia University of Georgia Press, 1986. Preview.
 Mooney, Chase C. Slavery in Tennessee, Indiana University Press, 1957.
 Olwell, Robert. Masters, Slaves, & Subjects: The Culture of Power in the South Carolina Low Country, 1740–1790 Cornell University Press, 1998.
 Reidy, Joseph P. From Slavery to Agrarian Capitalism in the Cotton Plantation South, Central Georgia, 1800–1880 University of North Carolina Press, 1992. Preview.
 Ripley, C. Peter. Slaves and Freemen in Civil War Louisiana Louisiana State University Press, 1976.
 Rivers, Larry Eugene. Slavery in Florida: Territorial Days to Emancipation, University Press of Florida, 2000. Preview.
 Sellers, James Benson; Slavery in Alabama University of Alabama Press, 1950. Preview.
 Sydnor, Charles S. Slavery in Mississippi, 1933. Preview.
 Takagi, Midori. Rearing Wolves to Our Own Destruction: Slavery in Richmond, Virginia, 1782–1865 University Press of Virginia, 1999. Preview.
 Taylor, Joe Gray. Negro Slavery in Louisiana. Louisiana Historical Society, 1963. Preview.
 Trexler, Harrison Anthony. Slavery in Missouri, 1804–1865, Johns Hopkins University Press, 1914. Preview. 
 Wood, Peter H. Black Majority: Negroes in Colonial South Carolina from 1670 through the Stono Rebellion W.W. Norton & Company, 1974. Preview.

Video
 Jenkins, Gary (director). Negroes To Hire (Lifedocumentaries, 2010); 52 minutes DVD; on slavery in Missouri
 

Historiography

 Ayers, Edward L. "The American Civil War, Emancipation, and Reconstruction on the World Stage," OAH Magazine of History, January 2006, Vol. 20, Issue 1, pp.54–60
 Berlin, Ira. "American Slavery in History and Memory and the Search for Social Justice," The Journal of American History, March 2004, Vol. 90, Issue 4, pp.1251–1268. Preview.
 Boles, John B. and Evelyn T. Nolen, eds., Interpreting Southern History: Historiographical Essays in Honor of Sanford W. Higginbotham (1987). Preview.
 Brown, Vincent. "Social Death and Political Life in the Study of Slavery," American Historical Review, December 2009, Vol. 114, Issue 5, pp.1231–1249, examined historical and sociological studies since the influential 1982 book Slavery and Social Death by American sociologist Orlando Patterson. Preview.
 Campbell, Gwyn. "Children and slavery in the new world: A review," Slavery & Abolition, August 2006, Vol. 27, Issue 2, pp.261–285
 Collins, Bruce. "Review: American Slavery and Its Consequences" Historical Journal (1979) 33#4 pp.997–1015 online
 Dirck, Brian. "Changing Perspectives on Lincoln, Race, and Slavery," OAH Magazine of History, October 2007, Vol. 21, Issue 4, pp.9–12. Preview.
 Farrow, Anne; Lang, Joel; Frank, Jenifer. Complicity: How the North Promoted, Prolonged, and Profited from Slavery, Ballantine Books, 2006, . Preview.
 Fogel, Robert W. The Slavery Debates, 1952–1990: A Retrospective, 2007.
  Preview.
 Frey, Sylvia R. "The Visible Church: Historiography of African American Religion since Raboteau," Slavery & Abolition, January 2008, Vol. 29 Issue 1, pp.83–110
 Hettle, Wallace. "White Society in the Old South: The Literary Evidence Reconsidered," Southern Studies: An Interdisciplinary Journal of the South, Fall/Winter 2006, Vol. 13, Issue 3/4, pp. 29–44
 King, Richard H. "Review: Marxism and the Slave South", American Quarterly 29 (1977), 117–131. focus on Genovese. Preview.
 Kolchin, Peter. "American Historians and Antebellum Southern Slavery, 1959–1984", in William J. Cooper, Michael F. Holt, and John McCardell, eds., A Master's Due: Essays in Honor of David Herbert Donald (1985), 87–111
 Laurie, Bruce. "Workers, Abolitionists, and the Historians: A Historiographical Perspective," Labor: Studies in Working Class History of the Americas, Winter 2008, Vol. 5, Issue 4, pp.17–55
 Neely Jr., Mark E. "Lincoln, Slavery, and the Nation," The Journal of American History, September 2009, Vol. 96 Issue 2, pp.456–458. Preview.
 Parish; Peter J. Slavery: History and Historians Westview Press. 1989. Preview.
 Penningroth, Dylan. "Writing Slavery's History," OAH Magazine of History, April 2009, Vol. 23 Issue 2, pp.13–20. Preview.
 Rael, Patrick. Eighty-Eight Years: The Long Death of Slavery in the United States, 1777–1865. Athens, GA: University of Georgia Press, 2015.
 Sidbury, James. "Globalization, Creolization, and the Not-So-Peculiar Institution," Journal of Southern History, August 2007, Vol. 73, Issue 3, pp.617–630, on colonial era. Preview.
 Stuckey, P. Sterling. "Reflections on the Scholarship of African Origins and Influence in American Slavery," Journal of African American History, Fall 2006, Vol. 91 Issue 4, pp.425–443. Preview.
 Sweet, John Wood. "The Subject of the Slave Trade: Recent Currents in the Histories of the Atlantic, Great Britain, and Western Africa," Early American Studies, An Interdisciplinary Journal, Spring 2009, Vol.7 Issue 1, pp.1–45
 Tadman, Michael. "The Reputation of the Slave Trader in Southern History and the Social Memory of the South," American Nineteenth Century History, September 2007, Vol. 8, Issue 3, pp.247–271
 Tulloch, Hugh. The Debate on the American Civil War Era (1998), ch. 2–4

Primary sources

 Albert, Octavia V. Rogers. The House of Bondage Or Charlotte Brooks and Other Slaves. Oxford University Press, 1991. Primary sources with commentary. 
 The House of Bondage, or, Charlotte Brooks and Other Slaves, Original and Life-Like complete text of original 1890 edition, along with cover & title page images, at website of University of North Carolina at Chapel Hill
 
 Berlin, Ira, Joseph P. Reidy, and Leslie S. Rowlands, eds., Freedom: A Documentary History of Emancipation, 1861–1867 5vol. Cambridge University Press, 1982. Very large collection of primary sources regarding the end of slavery.
 Berlin, Ira, Marc Favreau, and Steven F. Miller, eds., Remembering Slavery: African Americans Talk About Their Personal Experiences of Slavery and Emancipation The New Press: 2007. 
 Blassingame, John W., ed., Slave Testimony: Two Centuries of Letters, Speeches, Interviews, and Autobiographies. Louisiana State University Press, 1977.
 Burke, Diane Mutti, On Slavery's Border: Missouri's Small Slaveholding Households, 1815–1865,
 De Tocqueville, Alexis. Democracy in America. (1994 ed. by Alfred A. Knopf, Inc.) 
 A Narrative of the Life of Frederick Douglass, an American Slave (1845) (Project Gutenberg ), (Audio book at FreeAudio.org)
 Frederick Douglass, "The Heroic Slave." Autographs for Freedom, Julia Griffiths, ed., Boston: John P. Jewett and Company, 1853. pp. 174–239. Available at the Documenting the American South website.
 Frederick Douglass, My Bondage and My Freedom (1855) (Project Gutenberg )
 Frederick Douglass, Life and Times of Frederick Douglass (1881, revised 1892)
 Frederick Douglass, Collected Articles of Frederick Douglass, A Slave (Project Gutenberg)
 Frederick Douglass: Autobiographies by Frederick Douglass, Henry Louis Gates, Jr., ed. (Omnibus of all three) 
 Litwack, Leon, Been in the Storm So Long: The Aftermath of Slavery. (New York: Alfred A. Knopf, 1979) Winner of the 1981 National Book Award for history and the 1980 Pulitzer Prize for History.
 Litwack, Leon, North of Slavery: The Negro in the Free States, 1790–1860 (Chicago: University of Chicago Press, 1961)
 Document: "List Negroes at Spring Garden with their ages taken January 1829" (title taken from document)
 Missouri History Museum Archives Slavery Collection
 Rawick, George P., ed., The American Slave: A Composite Autobiography. 19 vols. Greenwood Publishing Company, 1972. Collection of WPA interviews made in the 1930s with ex-slaves

Further reading
Scholarly books

 Andrews, William L. (2019) Slavery and Class in the American South: A Generation of Slave Narrative Testimony, 1840–1865 (Oxford University Press, 2019).
  Preview.
 
  Preview.
 Brady, Steven J. Chained to History: Slavery and US Foreign Relations to 1865 (Cornell University Press, 2022) online reviews
 
 Gellman, David Nathaniel. Emancipating New York: The politics of slavery and freedom, 1777-1827 (LSU Press, 2006) online.
  Preview.
 Larson, Edward J. (2023) American Inheritance: Liberty and Slavery in the Birth of a Nation, 1765-1795 (W. W. Norton, 2023)  excerpt
 Morgan, Kenneth. (2022) Slavery and Servitude in North America, 1607-1800 (Edinburgh University Press, 2022).
 Parish, Peter J. (2022) Slavery (Edinburgh University Press, 2022).
 
 
 Schwalm, Leslie A. (2023) A hard fight for we: Women's transition from slavery to freedom in South Carolina (University of Illinois Press, 2023).

Scholarly articles

 Baker, Regina S. (2022)  "The historical racial regime and racial inequality in poverty in the American south." American Journal of Sociology 127.6 (2022): 1721-1781. online
 Hilt, Eric. (2010). "Revisiting Time on the Cross After 45 Years: The Slavery Debates and the New Economic History." Capitalism: A Journal of History and Economics, Volume 1, Number 2, pp.456–483. 
 
 Logan, Trevon D. (2022)  "American Enslavement and the Recovery of Black Economic History." Journal of Economic Perspectives 36.2 (2022): 81-98. online
 
 Naidu, S. (2020). "American slavery and labour market power." Economic History of Developing Regions, 35(1), 3–22. 
 
 
 

Oral histories and autobiographies of ex-slaves
 
 Blight, David W. (2009). A Slave No More: Two Men Who Escaped to Freedom, Including Their Own Narratives of Emancipation. Boston and New York: Mariner Books, Houghton Mifflin Harcourt. .
 
 
 
 
 
 
 
 

Discussions by foreigners
 

Literary and cultural criticism
 Ryan, Tim A. Calls and Responses: The American Novel of Slavery Since Gone with the Wind. Baton Rouge: Louisiana State University Press, 2008.
 Van Deburg, William. Slavery and Race in American Popular Culture. Madison: University of Wisconsin Press, 1984.
 Whitfield, James Monroe (black abolitionist poet), America and Other Poems, 1853.

Documentary films
 

External links

 Slavery in America: A Resource Guide, Library of Congress
 "Born in Slavery: Slave Narratives from the Federal Writers' Project, 1936 to 1938", Library of Congress
 "Voices Remembering Slavery: Freed People Tell Their Stories", audio interviews of former slaves, 1932–1975, Library of Congress
 Digital Library on American Slavery at University of North Carolina at Greensboro
 * "Slavery and the Making of America", WNET (4-part series)
 Slavery in America at the History Channel
 "Slavery in the United States", Economic History Encyclopedia, March 26, 2008
 North American Slave Narratives, Documenting the American South, Louis Round Wilson Library
 The Trans-Atlantic Slave Trade Database has information on almost 36,000 slaving voyages
 1850: New Orleans woman and child she held in slavery
 American Capitalism Is Brutal. You Can Trace That to the Plantation. The New York Times Magazine''. August 14, 2019.

1865 disestablishments in the United States
 
 
African-American-related controversies
Race-related controversies in the United States
Political controversies in the United States
African-American cultural history
Cultural history of the United States
Economic history of the American Civil War
Economic history of the United States
18th century in the United States
19th century in the United States
Labor history of the United States
Native American history
Plantations in the United States
Politics of the American Civil War
Slavery of Native Americans
Social history of the American Civil War
Social history of the United States
White supremacy in the United States
Political compromises in the United States